= C24H40O4 =

The molecular formula C_{24}H_{40}O_{4} (molar mass: 392.57 g/mol, exact mass: 392.29266) may refer to:

- Chenodeoxycholic acid, a bile acid
- Deoxycholic acid, a bile acid
- Hyodeoxycholic acid, a bile acid
- Ursodiol, a bile acid
