= Taurochenodeoxycholate 6α-hydroxylase =

Class of enzymes

Taurochenodeoxycholate 6alpha-hydroxylase

Identifiers
- EC no.: 1.14.14.57
- CAS no.: 105669-85-0

Databases
- IntEnz: IntEnz view
- BRENDA: BRENDA entry
- ExPASy: NiceZyme view
- KEGG: KEGG entry
- MetaCyc: metabolic pathway
- PRIAM: profile
- PDB structures: RCSB PDB PDBe PDBsum
Search
- PMC: articles
- PubMed: articles
- NCBI: proteins

A taurochenodeoxycholate 6alpha-hydroxylase (EC 1.14.14.57), (also called taurochenodeoxycholate 6alpha-monooxygenase) is an enzyme with systematic name taurochenodeoxycholate,NADPH:oxygen oxidoreductase (6alpha-hydroxylating). In humans, the multifunction protein CYP3A4 carries out this role among many others, while a separate protein in pigs, CYP4A21, has also been found to catalyze this same reaction. This enzyme catalyses some hydroxylation reactions of bile acids.

== Reactions catalysed ==
The bile acid, lithocholic acid, is converted to hyodeoxycholic acid:

lithocholic acid
+ NADPH
O_{2} + H^{+}
H_{2}O
hyodeoxycholic acid
+ NADP^{+}

The enzyme uses a combination of molecular oxygen and nicotinamide adenine dinucleotide phosphate (NADPH) for the oxidation.

Similarly, taurochenodeoxycholic acid is converted to taurohyocholic acid:

taurochenodeoxycholic acid
+ NADPH
O_{2} + H^{+}
H_{2}O
taurohyocholic acid
+ NADP^{+}

The enzyme is a cytochrome P450 protein containing heme.

== See also ==
- CYP3A4
