= C24H40O5 =

The molecular formula C_{24}H_{40}O_{5} (molar mass: 408.57 g/mol) may refer to:

- Cholic acid
- Hyocholic acid, or 3α,6α,7α-trihydroxy-5β-cholan-24-oic acid
- Muricholic acids
