= Hyodeoxycholic acid =

- Hyodeoxycholic acid

Names
- IUPAC name 3α,6α-Dihydroxy-5β-cholan-24-oic acid
- Systematic IUPAC name (4R)-4-[(1R,3aS,3bS,5S,5aR,7R,9aR,9bS,11aR)-5,7-Dihydroxy-9a,11a-dimethylhexadecahydro-1H-cyclopenta[a]phenanthren-1-yl]pentanoic acid

Identifiers
CAS Number	83-49-8
3D model (JSmol)	Interactive image
ChEBI	CHEBI:52023
ChEMBL	ChEMBL272621
ChemSpider	4446908
ECHA InfoCard	100.001.349
PubChem CID	5283820
UNII	7A33Y6EHYK
CompTox Dashboard (EPA)	DTXSID001018971
- InChI: InChI=1S/C24H40O4/c1-14(4-7-22(27)28)17-5-6-18-16-13-21(26)20-12-15(25)8-10-24(20,3)19(16)9-11-23(17,18)2/h14-21,25-26H,4-13H2,1-3H3,(H,27,28)/t14-,15-,16+,17-,18+,19+,20+,21+,23-,24-/m1/s1 Key: DGABKXLVXPYZII-SIBKNCMHSA-N; InChI=1/C24H40O4/c1-14(4-7-22(27)28)17-5-6-18-16-13-21(26)20-12-15(25)8-10-24(20,3)19(16)9-11-23(17,18)2/h14-21,25-26H,4-13H2,1-3H3,(H,27,28)/t14-,15-,16+,17-,18+,19+,20+,21+,23-,24-/m1/s1 Key: DGABKXLVXPYZII-SIBKNCMHBP
- SMILES: O=C(O)CC[C@@H](C)[C@@H]4[C@]3(CC[C@H]1[C@@H](C[C@H](O)[C@@H]2C[C@H](O)CC[C@]12C)[C@@H]3CC4)C

Properties
Chemical formula	C_{24}H_{40}O_{4}
Molar mass	392.58 g/mol
Density	? g/cm^{3}
Melting point	200 to 201 °C (392 to 394 °F; 473 to 474 K)
- Except where otherwise noted, data are given for materials in their standard state (at 25 °C [77 °F], 100 kPa). verify (what is ?) Infobox references

Hyodeoxycholic acid, also known as 3α,6α-Dihydroxy-5β-cholan-24-oic acid or HDCA, is a secondary bile acid, one of the metabolic byproducts of intestinal bacteria. It differs from deoxycholic acid in that the 6α-hydroxyl is in the 12 position in the former. The 6α-hydroxyl group makes HDCA a hydrophilic acid, a property it shares with hyocholic acid. HDCA is present in mammalian species in different proportions. It is the main acid constituent of hog bile, and for this reason it was used industrially as precursor for steroid synthesis before total synthesis became practical.

== Metabolism ==
In rat intestinal microflora hyodeoxycholic acid is produced by a Gram-positive rod—termed HDCA-1—from several isomers of hyocholic acid and muricholic acid. In pigs with a normal gastrointestinal flora the majority of hyodeoxycholic acid found in bile is of secondary nature, but a small amount was also found in germ free pigs, which supports the hypothesis that HDCA may be a primary bile acid in this species. In healthy humans only traces of HDCA have been found in urine, but in patients with cholestatic liver disease or intestinal malabsorption a significant amount has been found excreted.

Hyodeoxycholic acid undergoes glucuronidation in human liver and kidneys. Glucuronidation of hyodeoxycholic and hyocholic acids was observed to occur extensively at the 6α-hydroxyl group, unlike primary bile acids which form 3α-hydroxy-linked glucuronides. This suggests an important pathway for the elimination of toxic and cholestatic bile acids, e.g. lithocholic and chenodeoxycholic acids which can form hyodeoxycholic and hyocholic acids, respectively, after 6α-hydroxilation. The enzyme family responsible for glucosidation of hyodeoxycholic acid in human liver is UDP-glucuronosyltransferase. Both the UGT2B4 and UGT2B7 isoforms are able to glucuronidate HDCA. This is an example of redundancy in protection against harmful endogenous compounds provided by UGT isoforms, which present distinct but frequently overlapping substrate specificity. A common amino-acid residue that confers these two isoforms specificity to HDCA has been identified in 2006.

Animal model studies support the concept that bile acids may play a role in the development of colon cancer. Deoxycholic acid (DCA) is believed to be tumor promoter, while ursodeoxycholic acid (UDCA) was found to suppress the development of colon tumors. The mechanism that accounts for this difference in function is not clear. In vitro studies found that DCA induces apoptosis in some colon cancer cell lines, while UDCA arrests cell proliferation without inducing apoptosis. In these studies HDCA exhibited biological activity that is intermediate to DCA and UDCA, arresting growth for a time, but causing apoptosis after extended exposure.

== Applications ==
It was known since 1939 that HDCA could be used to synthesize progesterone. A decade later, an analysis of the composition of hog bile determined that HDCA accounted for approximately 40% of its acid contents. In the 1950s, lacking access to vegetal precursors of steroids, like diosgenin, the East German company Jenapharm used hyodeoxycholic acid extracted from hog bile as the sole precursor for steroid synthesis.

In the 1980s, hyodeoxycholic acid was investigated for its propensity to prevent cholesterol-induced gallstones in animals fed with a lithogenic diet. Another animal study determined that oral administration of HDCA leads to a decrease in LDL-cholesterol concentration, a strong stimulation of hepatic cholesterol biosynthesis and an excessive loss of cholesterol in feces. Unlike ursodeoxycholic acid, which is an approved drug for the treatment of gallstones, HDCA is not marketed for any medical condition.

In supramolecular chemistry a molecular tweezer based on a hyodeoxycholic acid showed a high selectivity the towards the fluorine radical.

== See also ==
- Chenodeoxycholic acid for a similar molecular tweezer which exhibits different selectivity
