= Cholesterol 7 alpha-hydroxylase =

Enzyme found in humans

CYP7A1
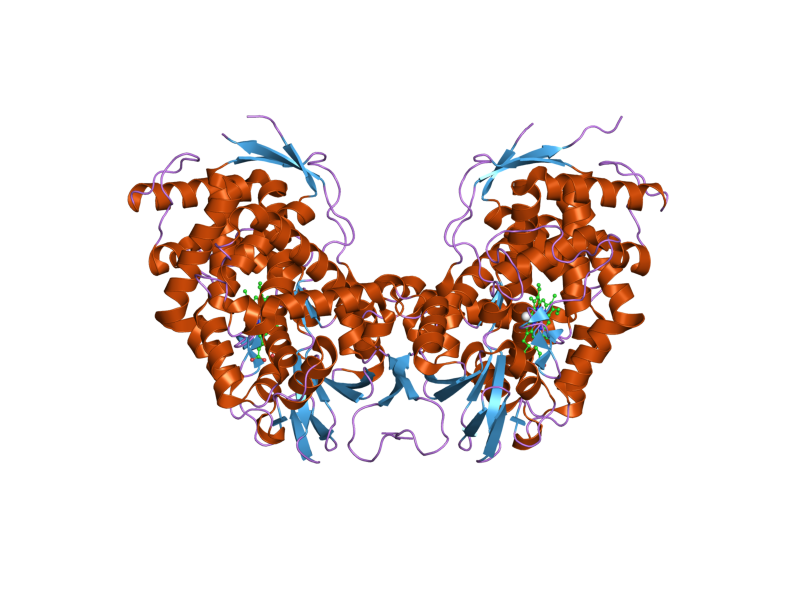

Identifiers
- Aliases: CYP7A1, CP7A, CYP7, CYPVII, cytochrome P450 family 7 subfamily A member 1
- External IDs: OMIM: 118455; MGI: 106091; GeneCards: CYP7A1
Available structures
PDB	Ortholog search: PDBe RCSB
PDB	List of PDB id codes 3DAX, 3SN5, 3V8D
Enzyme activity
EC #	BRENDA	ExPASy	KEGG	MetaCyc
1.14.14.23	↗	↗	↗	↗
1.14.14.26	↗	↗	↗	↗

Gene location (Human)
Chr.	Chromosome 8 (human)
Band	8q12.1	Start	58,490,178 bp
Band	8q12.1	End	58,500,163 bp

Gene location (Mouse)
Chr.	Chromosome 4 (mouse)
Band	4|4 A1	Start	6,265,612 bp
Band	4|4 A1	End	6,275,633 bp
RNA expression pattern
Bgee	Human / Mouse (ortholog); Top expressed in: right lobe of liver; gonad; duodenum; subcutaneous adipose tissue; abdominal wall; spleen; gallbladder; mammary gland; lactiferous gland; tibial nerve / Top expressed in: liver; left lobe of liver; lumbar subsegment of spinal cord; primary oocyte; secondary oocyte; gastrula; zygote; vestibular membrane of cochlear duct; trachea; lumbar spinal ganglion; More reference expression data
BioGPS	n/a
Gene ontology
Molecular function	iron ion binding; metal ion binding; monooxygenase activity; heme binding; oxidoreductase activity, acting on paired donors, with incorporation or reduction of molecular oxygen; oxidoreductase activity; cholesterol 7-alpha-monooxygenase activity
Cellular component	organelle membrane; endoplasmic reticulum membrane; intracellular membrane-bounded organelle; membrane; endoplasmic reticulum
Biological process	steroid metabolic process; lipid metabolism; cholesterol metabolic process; cholesterol catabolic process; cellular response to cholesterol; regulation of bile acid biosynthetic process; sterol metabolic process; cholesterol homeostasis; bile acid biosynthetic process; cellular response to glucose stimulus; regulation of lipid metabolic process; positive regulation of cholesterol biosynthetic process; negative regulation of fatty acid biosynthetic process
Sources:Amigo / QuickGO
Orthologs
Databases	NCBI: entry; OMA: entry
Species	Human	Mouse
Entrez	1581	13122
Ensembl	ENSG00000167910	ENSMUSG00000028240
UniProt	P22680	Q64505
RefSeq (mRNA)	NM_000780	NM_007824
RefSeq (protein)	NP_000771	NP_031850
Location (UCSC)	Chr 8: 58.49 – 58.5 Mb	Chr 4: 6.27 – 6.28 Mb
PubMed search
- Wikidata
View/Edit Human	View/Edit Mouse

Cholesterol 7 alpha-hydroxylase, also known as cholesterol 7-alpha-monooxygenase or cytochrome P450 7A1 (CYP7A1) is the rate-limiting enzyme in the synthesis of bile acid from cholesterol via the classic pathway, catalyzing the formation of 7α-hydroxycholesterol. In humans, it is encoded by the CYP7A1 gene. It is a cytochrome P450 enzyme, which belongs to the oxidoreductase class, and converts cholesterol to 7-alpha-hydroxycholesterol, the first and rate limiting step in bile acid synthesis.

The inhibition of cholesterol 7-alpha-hydroxylase (CYP7A1) represses bile acid biosynthesis.

== Evolution ==
Sequence comparisons indicated a huge similarity between cytochromes P450 identified in man and bacteria, and suggested that the superfamily cytochrome P450 first originated from a common ancestral gene some three billion years ago.

The superfamily cytochrome P450 was named in 1961, because of the 450-nm spectral peak pigment that cytochrome P450 has when reduced and bound to carbon monoxide. In the early 1960s, P450 was thought to be one enzyme, and by the mid-1960s it was associated with drug and steroid metabolism.

However, the membrane-associated and hydrophobic nature of the enzyme system impeded purification, and the number of proteins involved could not be accurately counted. Advances in mRNA purification in the early 1980s allowed to isolate the first cDNA encoding a complete cytochrome P450 (CYP) protein, and thereafter, results of many cloning studies have revealed a large number of different enzymes.

Advances in molecular biology and genomics facilitated the biochemical characterisation of individual P450 enzymes:

- The cytochromes P450 act on many endogenous substrates, introducing oxidative, peroxidative, and reductive changes into small molecules of widely different chemical structures. Substrates identified to date include saturated and unsaturated fatty acids, eicosanoids, sterols and steroids, bile acids, vitamin D3 derivatives, retinoids, and uroporphyrinogens.
- Many cytochrome P450 enzymes can metabolise various exogenous compounds including drugs, environmental chemicals and pollutants, and natural plant products.
- Metabolism of foreign chemicals frequently results in successful detoxication of the irritant; However, the actions of P450 enzymes can also generate toxic metabolites that contribute to increased risks of cancer, birth defects, and other toxic effects.
- The expression of many P450 enzymes is often induced by accumulation of a substrate.
- The ability of one P450 substrate to affect the concentrations of another in this manner is the basis for so-called drug-drug interactions, which complicate treatment.

== Molecular structure ==
Cholesterol 7 alpha hydroxylase consists of 491 amino acids, which on folding forms 23 alpha helices and 26 beta sheets.

Cholesterol 7-alpha Hydroxylase Rotation

== Function ==
Cholesterol 7 alpha-hydroxylase (CYP7A1) is a cytochrome P450 heme enzyme that oxidizes cholesterol in the position 7 using molecular oxygen. It is an oxidoreductase. CYP7A1 is located in the endoplasmic reticulum (ER) and is important for the synthesis of bile acid and the regulation of cholesterol levels.

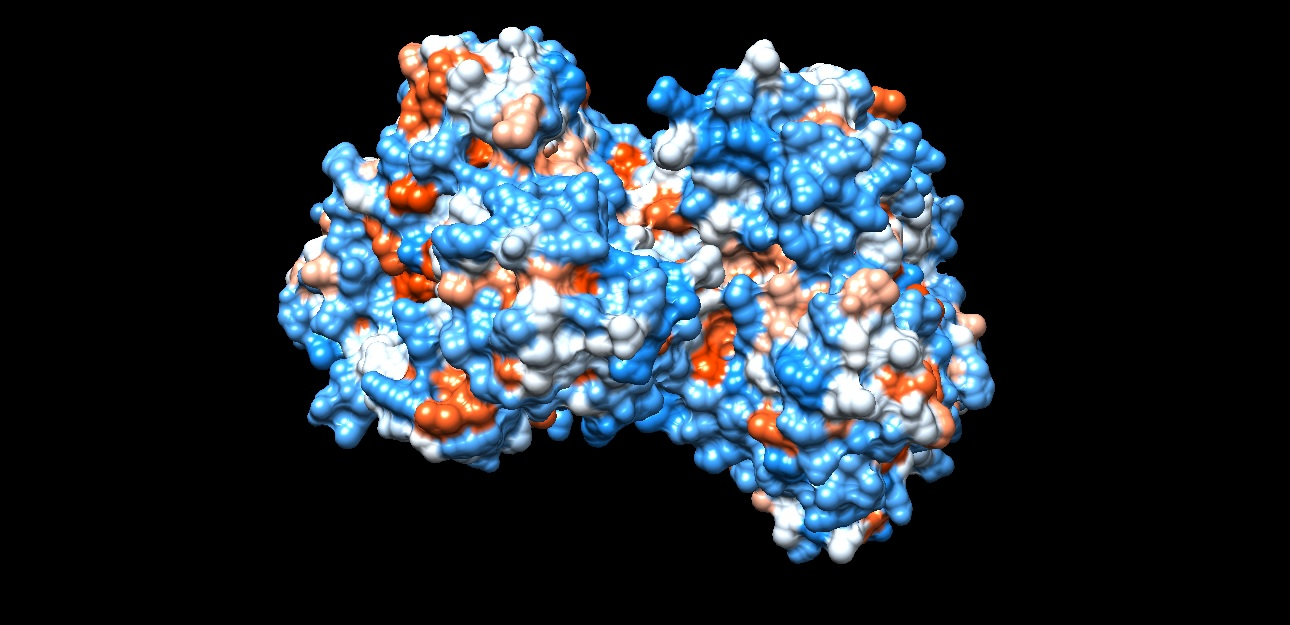
Hydrophobic image of cholesterol 7-alpha-hydroxylase

=== Synthesis of bile acid ===
Cholesterol 7 alpha-hydroxylase is the rate-limiting enzyme in the synthesis of bile acid from cholesterol via the classic pathway, catalyzing the formation of 7α-hydroxycholesterol.

7α-hydroxycholesterol subsequently forms a number of bile acids, including taurocholic, glycocholic, taurochenodeoxycholic, and glycochenodeoxycholic acid produced and secreted from the human liver. The activity of CYP7A1 regulates the production of chenodeoxycholic acid and cholic acid, which are primary bile acids produced in the liver through the oxidation of cholesterol. The unique detergent properties of bile acids are essential for the digestion and intestinal absorption of hydrophobic nutrients.

Bile acids have powerful toxic properties including membrane disruption and there are a wide range of mechanisms to restrict their accumulation in tissues and blood. The discovery of farnesoid X receptor (FXR), which is located in the liver and intestine, opened new insights. Bile acid activation of FXR in liver represses the expression of CYP7A1 by raising the expression of small heterodimer partner (SHP, NR0B2), a non-DNA binding protein. The increased abundance of SHP causes it to associate with liver receptor homolog (LRH)-1, which is an obligate factor required for the transcription of CYP7A1.

Furthermore, there is an "FXR/SHP-independent" mechanism that also represses CYP7A1 expression. This "FXR/SHP-independent" pathway involves the interaction of bile acids with liver macrophages, which finally induces the expression and secretion of cytokines. These inflammatory cytokines, which include tumor necrosis factor alpha and interleukin-1beta, act upon the liver parenchymal cells causing a rapid repression of the CYP7A1 gene.

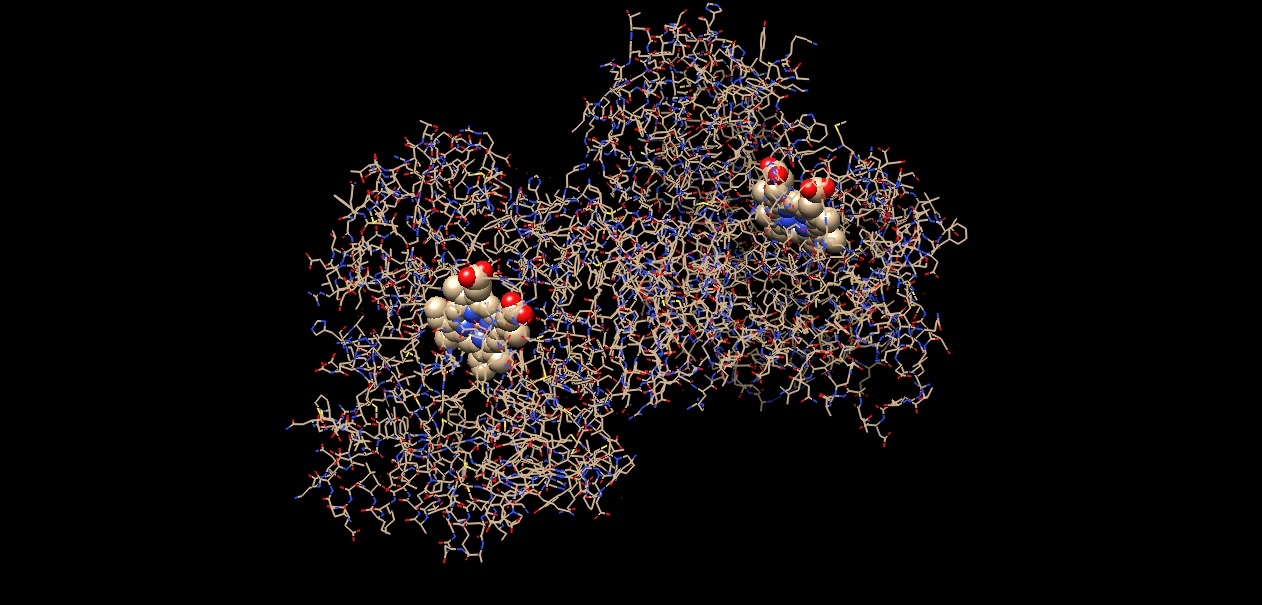
Atomic structure of cholesterol 7-alpha-hydroxylase

=== Regulation of activity ===
Regulation of CYP7A1 occurs at several levels including synthesis. Bile acids, steroid hormones, inflammatory cytokines, insulin, and growth factors inhibit CYP7A1 transcription through the 5′-upstream region of the promoter. The average life of this enzyme is between two and three hours. Activity can be regulated by phosphorylation-dephosphorylation.

CYP7A1 is upregulated by the nuclear receptor LXR (liver X receptor) when cholesterol (to be specific, oxysterol) levels are high. The effect of this upregulation is to increase the production of bile acids and reduce the level of cholesterol in hepatocytes.

It is downregulated by sterol regulatory element-binding proteins (SREBP) when plasma cholesterol levels are low.

Bile acids provide feedback inhibition of CYP7A1 by at least two different pathways, both involving the farnesoid X receptor, FXR. In the liver, bile acids bound to FXR induce small heterodimer partner, SHP which binds to LRH-1 and so inhibits the transcription of the enzyme. In the intestine, bile acids/FXR stimulate production of FGF15/19 (depending on species), which then acts as a hormone in the liver via FGFR4.

== Enzymatic mechanism ==
=== Specificity ===
One feature of enzymes is their high specificity. They are specific on a singular substrate, reaction or both together, that means, that the enzymes can catalyze all reactions wherein the substrate can experience.

The enzyme cholesterol 7 alpha hydroxylase catalyzes the reaction that converts cholesterol into cholesterol 7 alpha hydroxylase reducing and oxidizing that molecule.

=== Interactive pathway map ===
Click on genes, proteins and metabolites below to link to respective articles. (Note: The interactive pathway map can be edited at WikiPathways: "Statin_Pathway_WP430".)

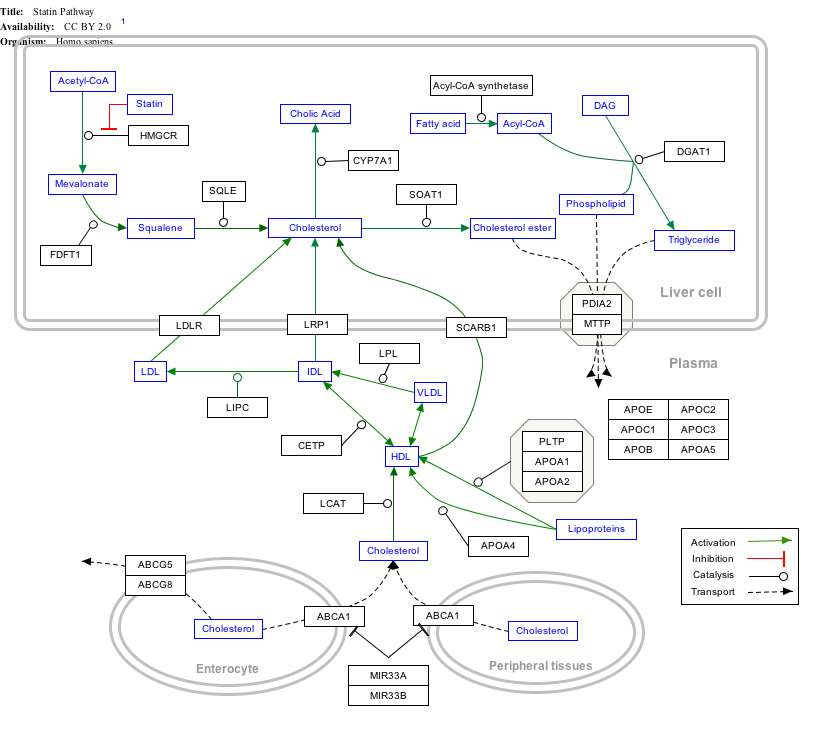

Statin pathway edit

== Clinical significance ==
Deficiency of this enzyme will increase the possibility of cholesterol gallstones.

Disruption of CYP7A1 from classic bile acid synthesis in mice leads to either increased postnatal death or a milder phenotype with elevated serum cholesterol. The latter is similar to the case in humans, where CYP7A1 mutations associate with high plasma low-density lipoprotein and hepatic cholesterol content, as well as deficient bile acid excretion. There is also a synergy between plasma low-density lipoprotein cholesterol (LDL-C) and risks of coronary artery disease (CAD). Glucose signaling also induces CYP7A1 gene transcription by epigenetic regulation of the histone acetylation status. Glucose induction of bile acid synthesis have an important implication in metabolic control of glucose, lipid, and energy homeostasis under normal and diabetic conditions. CYP7A1-rs3808607 and apolipoprotein E (APOE) isoform are associated with the extent of reduction in circulating LDL cholesterol in response to plant sterol consumption and could serve as potential predictive genetic markers to identify individuals who would derive maximum LDL cholesterol lowering with plant sterol consumption. Genetic variations in CYP7A1 influence its expression and thus may affect the risk of gallstone disease and gallbladder cancer.

One of the many lipid lowering effects of the fibrate drug class is mediated through the inhibition of transcription of this enzyme. This inhibition leads to more cholesterol in the bile, which is the body's only route of cholesterol excretion. This also increases the risk of cholesterol gallstone formation.

Inhibition of CYP7A1 is thought to be involved in or responsible for the hepatotoxicity associated with ketoconazole. The levorotatory enantiomer of ketoconazole, levoketoconazole, shows 12-fold reduced potency in inhibition of this enzyme, and is under development for certain indications (e.g., Cushing's syndrome) as a replacement for ketoconazole with reduced toxicity and improved tolerability and safety.

== See also ==
- Steroidogenic enzyme
