= 12alpha-hydroxysteroid dehydrogenase =

Class of enzymes

12-alpha-hydroxysteroid dehydrogenase

Identifiers
- EC no.: 1.1.1.176
- CAS no.: 61642-40-8

Databases
- IntEnz: IntEnz view
- BRENDA: BRENDA entry
- ExPASy: NiceZyme view
- KEGG: KEGG entry
- MetaCyc: metabolic pathway
- PRIAM: profile
- PDB structures: RCSB PDB PDBe PDBsum
- Gene Ontology: AmiGO / QuickGO
Search
- PMC: articles
- PubMed: articles
- NCBI: proteins

In enzymology, 12alpha-hydroxysteroid dehydrogenase (EC 1.1.1.176) is an enzyme that catalyzes the chemical reaction

cholic acid
+ NADP^{+}
H^{+}
H^{+}
12-ketochenodeoxycholic acid
+ NADPH

The two substrates of this enzyme are the bile acid, cholic acid, and oxidised nicotinamide adenine dinucleotide phosphate (NADP^{+}). Its products are 12-ketochenodeoxycholic acid, reduced NADPH, and a proton.

This enzyme belongs to the family of oxidoreductases, specifically those acting on the CH-OH group of donor with NAD^{+} or NADP^{+} as acceptor. The systematic name of this enzyme class is 12alpha-hydroxysteroid:NADP^{+} 12-oxidoreductase. Other names in common use include 12alpha-hydroxy steroid dehydrogenase, 12alpha-hydroxy steroid dehydrogenase, NAD^{+}-dependent 12alpha-hydroxysteroid dehydrogenase, and NADP^{+}-12alpha-hydroxysteroid dehydrogenase. This enzyme is involved in a metabolic pathway that degrades bile acids into cholesterol.
