= 3alpha-hydroxycholanate dehydrogenase =

Class of enzymes

3-alpha-hydroxycholanate dehydrogenase

Identifiers
- EC no.: 1.1.1.52
- CAS no.: 9028-57-3

Databases
- IntEnz: IntEnz view
- BRENDA: BRENDA entry
- ExPASy: NiceZyme view
- KEGG: KEGG entry
- MetaCyc: metabolic pathway
- PRIAM: profile
- PDB structures: RCSB PDB PDBe PDBsum
- Gene Ontology: AmiGO / QuickGO
Search
- PMC: articles
- PubMed: articles
- NCBI: proteins

In enzymology, a 3alpha-hydroxycholanate dehydrogenase (EC 1.1.1.52) is an enzyme that catalyzes the chemical reaction

Lithocholic acid
+ NAD^{+}
H^{+}
H^{+}
Dehydrolithocholic acid
+ NADH

The two substrates of this enzyme are the bile acid lithocholic acid and nicotinamide adenine dinucleotide (NAD^{+}). Its products are dehydrolithocholic acid, NADH, and a proton.

This enzyme belongs to the family of oxidoreductases, specifically those acting on the CH-OH group of donor with NAD^{+} or NADP^{+} as acceptor. The systematic name of this enzyme class is 3alpha-hydroxy-5beta-cholanate:NAD^{+} oxidoreductase. This enzyme is also called alpha-hydroxy-cholanate dehydrogenase.

== Structural studies ==
As of late 2007, only one structure has been solved for this class of enzymes, with the PDB accession code 1IHI.
