= CYP8B1 =

Protein-coding gene in the species Homo sapiens

Identifiers
- Aliases: CYP8B1, CP8B, CYP12, cytochrome P450 family 8 subfamily B member 1
- External IDs: OMIM: 602172; MGI: 1338044; GeneCards: CYP8B1
Enzyme activity
EC #	BRENDA	ExPASy	KEGG	MetaCyc
1.14.14.139	↗	↗	↗	↗

Gene location (Human)
Chr.	Chromosome 3 (human)
Band	3p22.1	Start	42,856,005 bp
Band	3p22.1	End	42,875,898 bp

Gene location (Mouse)
Chr.	Chromosome 9 (mouse)
Band	9 72.73 cM|9 F4	Start	121,743,422 bp
Band	9 72.73 cM|9 F4	End	121,745,371 bp
RNA expression pattern
Bgee	Human / Mouse (ortholog); Top expressed in: right lobe of liver; tibialis anterior muscle; sural nerve; pancreatic ductal cell; renal cortex; renal medulla; gallbladder; right coronary artery; left coronary artery; human kidney / Top expressed in: left lobe of liver; gallbladder; sexually immature organism; medial head of gastrocnemius muscle; esophagus; lip; muscle of thigh; central gray substance of midbrain; nucleus of stria terminalis; pancreas; More reference expression data
BioGPS	n/a
Gene ontology
Molecular function	monooxygenase activity; iron ion binding; oxygen binding; oxidoreductase activity; heme binding; oxidoreductase activity, acting on paired donors, with incorporation or reduction of molecular oxygen; metal ion binding; 7alpha-hydroxycholest-4-en-3-one 12alpha-hydroxylase activity; sterol 12-alpha-hydroxylase activity
Cellular component	integral component of membrane; organelle membrane; endoplasmic reticulum membrane; endoplasmic reticulum; membrane; intracellular membrane-bounded organelle
Biological process	sterol metabolic process; bile acid biosynthetic process
Sources:Amigo / QuickGO
Orthologs
Databases	NCBI: entry; OMA: entry
Species	Human	Mouse
Entrez	1582	13124
Ensembl	ENSG00000180432	ENSMUSG00000050445
UniProt	Q9UNU6	O88962
RefSeq (mRNA)	NM_004391	NM_010012
RefSeq (protein)	NP_004382	NP_034142
Location (UCSC)	Chr 3: 42.86 – 42.88 Mb	Chr 9: 121.74 – 121.75 Mb
PubMed search
- Wikidata
View/Edit Human	View/Edit Mouse

CYP8B1 (cytochrome P450, family 8, subfamily B, polypeptide 1) also known as sterol 12-alpha-hydroxylase is a protein which in humans is encoded by the CYP8B1 gene.

This gene encodes a member of the cytochrome P450 superfamily of enzymes. The cytochrome P450 proteins are monooxygenases which catalyze many reactions involved in drug metabolism and synthesis of cholesterol, steroids and other lipids.

== Gene ==
CYP8B1 is unique among the cytochrome P450 genes in that it is intronless.

== Function ==
CYP8B1 is an endoplasmic reticulum membrane protein and catalyzes the conversion of 7 alpha-hydroxy-4-cholesten-3-one into 7-alpha,12-alpha-dihydroxy-4-cholesten-3-one. The balance between these two steroids determines the relative amounts of the two primary bile acids, cholic acid and chenodeoxycholic acid, both of which are secreted in the bile. In the intestine these bile acids affect the solubility of cholesterol and other lipids, promoting their absorption.

== In other species ==
The elephant, manatee and naked mole rat have inactive copies of this gene and consequently lack cholic acid in their bile. Relaxed selection resulting from changes in diet to consume less lipids might have contributed to the loss of this gene in several species.
