= Hyocholic acid =

Type of bile acid

Names
- IUPAC name 3α,6α,7α-Trihydroxy-5β-cholan-24-oic acid
- Systematic IUPAC name (4R)-4-[(1R,3aS,3bS,4S,5R,5aR,7R,9aR,9bS,11aR)-4,5,7-Trihydroxy-9a,11a-dimethylhexadecahydro-1H-cyclopenta[a]phenanthren-1-yl]pentanoic acid
- Other names γ-Muricholic acid; Iocholic acid

Identifiers
CAS Number	547-75-1
3D model (JSmol)	Interactive image
ChEBI	CHEBI:81244
ChEMBL	ChEMBL1908063
ChemSpider	83777
ECHA InfoCard	100.008.124
EC Number	208-935-8
KEGG	C17649
PubChem CID	92805
UNII	2H5H0Q47FL
CompTox Dashboard (EPA)	DTXSID20862167
- InChI: InChI=1S/C24H40O5/c1-13(4-7-19(26)27)15-5-6-16-20-17(9-11-23(15,16)2)24(3)10-8-14(25)12-18(24)21(28)22(20)29/h13-18,20-22,25,28-29H,4-12H2,1-3H3,(H,26,27)/t13-,14-,15-,16+,17+,18+,20+,21-,22+,23-,24-/m1/s1 Key: DKPMWHFRUGMUKF-KWXDGCAGSA-N
- SMILES: C[C@H](CCC(=O)O)[C@H]1CC[C@@H]2[C@@]1(CC[C@H]3[C@H]2[C@@H]([C@@H]([C@H]4[C@@]3(CC[C@H](C4)O)C)O)O)C

Properties
Chemical formula	C_{24}H_{40}O_{5}
Molar mass	408.579 g·mol^{−1}
- Except where otherwise noted, data are given for materials in their standard state (at 25 °C [77 °F], 100 kPa). Infobox references

Hyocholic acid or 3α,6α,7α-trihydroxy-5β-cholan-24-oic acid is a bile acid found as one of the main forms in pig, and at low concentrations in other species including humans. Hyocholic acid differs from the primary bile acids found in humans by having a third hydroxyl group in the α-conformation at the 6-position, unlike cholic acid, which has a 12-hydroxyl, and chenodeoxycholic acid which has neither a 6- or 12-hydroxyl. It also differs from the muricholic acids found in rodents, as they are 6β-hydroxylated, and can have the 7-hydroxyl in either the α- or β- positions, forming α- or β-muricholic acids.

Hyocholic acid is conjugated in the liver before secretion with taurine or with glycine to give taurohyocholate or glycohyocholates. Bacterial 7α-dehydroxylation in the colon produces the secondary bile acid, hyodeoxycholic acid. Epimerization of the 7-hydroxyl to the β-position is found in ω-muricholic acid (also known as β-hyocholic acid).

The enzyme responsible for the 6-hydroxylation reaction of chenodeoxycholic acid in the pig is the cytochrome P450 CYP4A21.

Hyocholic acid can be found in humans with cholestasis and may be increased after sleeve gastrectomy for obesity.
