= Cholestanetetraol 26-dehydrogenase =

Enzyme

cholestanetetraol 26-dehydrogenase

Identifiers
- EC no.: 1.1.1.161
- CAS no.: 62213-60-9

Databases
- IntEnz: IntEnz view
- BRENDA: BRENDA entry
- ExPASy: NiceZyme view
- KEGG: KEGG entry
- MetaCyc: metabolic pathway
- PRIAM: profile
- PDB structures: RCSB PDB PDBe PDBsum
- Gene Ontology: AmiGO / QuickGO
Search
- PMC: articles
- PubMed: articles
- NCBI: proteins

In enzymology, a cholestanetetraol 26-dehydrogenase (EC 1.1.1.161) is an enzyme that catalyzes the chemical reaction

(25R)-5beta-cholestane-3alpha,7alpha,12alpha,26-tetraol + NAD^{+} $\rightleftharpoons$ (25R)-3alpha,7alpha,12alpha-trihydroxy-5beta-cholestan-26-al + NADH + H^{+}

Thus, the two substrates of this enzyme are (25R)-5beta-cholestane-3alpha,7alpha,12alpha,26-tetraol and NAD^{+}, whereas its 3 products are (25R)-3alpha,7alpha,12alpha-trihydroxy-5beta-cholestan-26-al, NADH, and H^{+}.

This enzyme belongs to the family of oxidoreductases, specifically those acting on the CH-OH group of donor with NAD^{+} or NADP^{+} as acceptor. The systematic name of this enzyme class is (25R)-5beta-cholestane-3alpha,7alpha,12alpha,26-tetraol:NAD^{+} 26-oxidoreductase. Other names in common use include cholestanetetraol 26-dehydrogenase, 5beta-cholestane-3alpha,7alpha,12alpha,26-tetrol dehydrogenase, TEHC-NAD oxidoreductase, 5beta-cholestane-3alpha,7alpha,12alpha,26-tetraol:NAD^{+}, and 26-oxidoreductase. This enzyme participates in bile acid biosynthesis.
