= HDCA =

HDCA may refer to:

- Human Development and Capability Association
- Hyodesoxycholic acid
- Honors Diploma in Computer Application
