= Lithocholate 6beta-hydroxylase =

Class of enzymes

Identifiers
- EC no.: 1.14.13.94

Databases
- IntEnz: IntEnz view
- BRENDA: BRENDA entry
- ExPASy: NiceZyme view
- KEGG: KEGG entry
- MetaCyc: metabolic pathway
- PRIAM: profile
- PDB structures: RCSB PDB PDBe PDBsum
Search
- PMC: articles
- PubMed: articles
- NCBI: proteins

In enzymology, a lithocholate 6beta-hydroxylase (EC 1.14.13.94) is an enzyme that catalyzes the chemical reaction

lithocholate + NADPH + H^{+} + O_{2} $\rightleftharpoons$ 6beta-hydroxylithocholate + NADP^{+} + H_{2}O

The 4 substrates of this enzyme are lithocholate, NADPH, H^{+}, and O_{2}, whereas its 3 products are 6beta-hydroxylithocholate, NADP^{+}, and H_{2}O.

This enzyme belongs to the family of oxidoreductases, specifically those acting on paired donors, with O2 as oxidant and incorporation or reduction of oxygen. The oxygen incorporated need not be derived from O2 with NADH or NADPH as one donor, and incorporation of one atom o oxygen into the other donor. The systematic name of this enzyme class is lithocholate,NADPH:oxygen oxidoreductase (6beta-hydroxylating). Other names in common use include lithocholate 6beta-monooxygenase, CYP3A10, 6beta-hydroxylase, and cytochrome P450 3A10/lithocholic acid 6beta-hydroxylase.
