= Muricholic acid =

Group of bile acids found as one of the main forms in mice

Muricholic acids are a group of bile acids found as some of the main forms in mice, which gives them their name, and at low concentrations in other species.

The two principal forms, α- and β-muricholic acids, differ from the primary bile acids found in humans, cholic acid and chenodeoxycholic acid, by both having a hydroxyl group at the 6-position in the β-configuration. The orientation of the hydroxyl group at the 7-position defines whether they are α- or β-muricholic acid. Muricholic acids are detectable at low concentrations in human urine.

The three major bile acids in germ-free mice are cholic acid, α-muricholic, and β-muricholic acids. In conventional mice with a normal microbiome, ω-muricholic acid (with hydroxyls in the 6α- and 7β-positions), and various sulfated forms are also found. Conjugation with taurine takes place in the liver before secretion to give tauromuricholic acids, which are the main conjugated forms in mice, or with glycine to give glycomuricholic acid.

The enzyme responsible for the 6-hydroxylation reactions forming muricholates in mice is the cytochrome P450 Cyp2c70. This produces α-muricholic acid from chenodeoxycholic acid, and β-muricholic acid from ursodeoxycholic acid.

Tauromuricholic acids were shown to be potent antagonists of the bile acid receptor farnesoid X receptor (FXR).

== Chemical structures ==
α-muricholic acid

β-muricholic acid

γ-muricholic acid (hyocholic acid)

ω-muricholic acid
