= Hepatic microvascular dysplasia =

Liver disorder

Hepatic microvascular dysplasia (HMD or MVD) or portal atresia is a disorder where mixing of venous blood and arterial blood in the liver occurs at the microscopic level. It occurs most commonly in certain dog breeds such as the Cairn and Yorkshire Terriers although any dog breed may be at risk.

This disease may also be found in cats.

HMD is sometimes misdiagnosed as Portosystemic vascular anomaly (PSVA) or a "Liver Shunt" (portosystemic shunt). HMD can be diagnosed with an MRI, using a tracing dye in the subject's blood, and observing the flow of blood through the subject's liver and surrounding areas (stomach, intestine) for anomalies. It can also be diagnosed using a bile-acid level test; or more accurately, a "fasting-blood ammonia levels" test. Symptoms include stunted growth in the first 6–9 months, vomiting, seizures, and hydro-encephalitic episodes (from ammonia concentrating in the blood). HMD is usually treated non-surgically with antibiotics (metronidazole) and stool-softeners (lactulose).
