= Taurocholic acid =

Yellowish crystalline bile acid

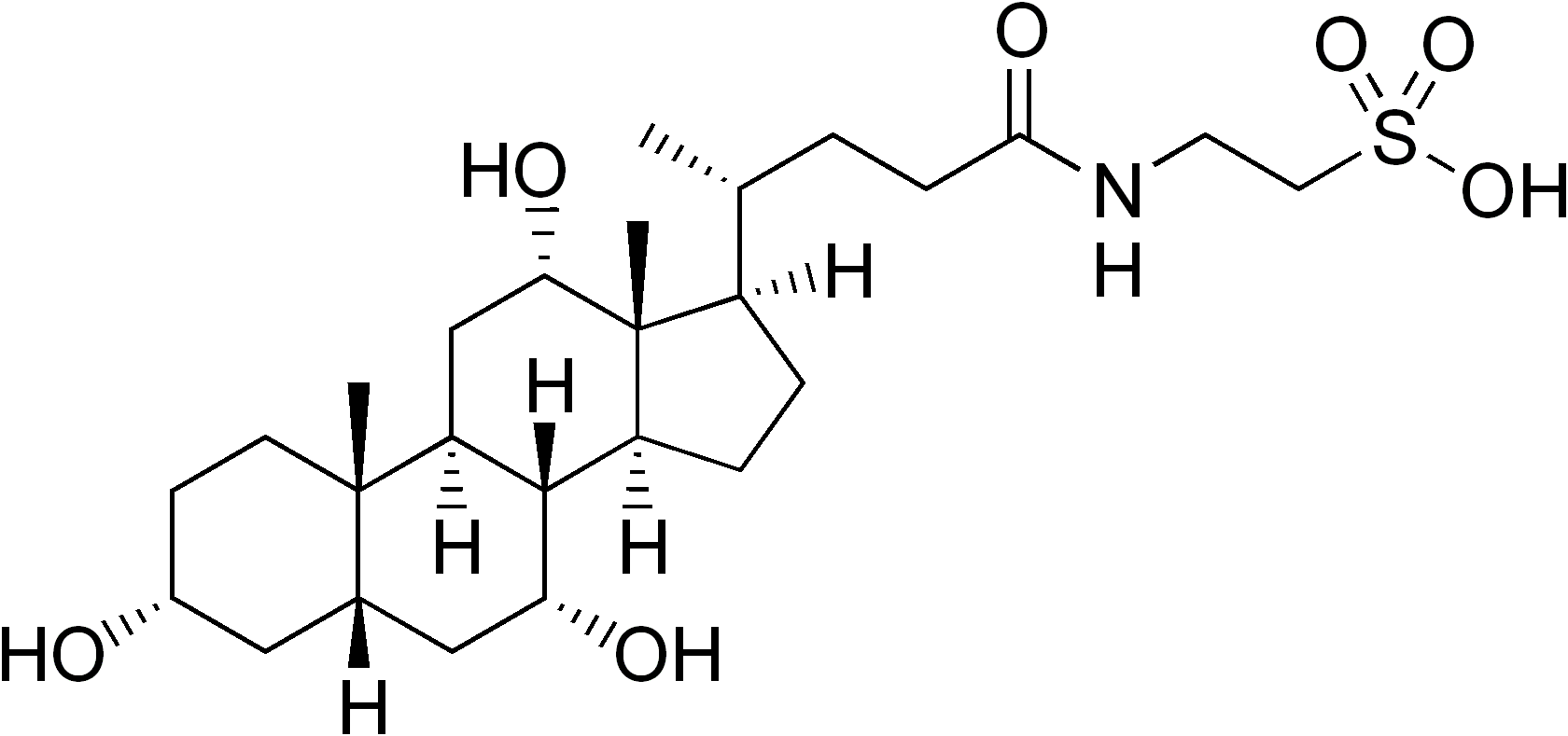
- Taurocholic acid

Names
- IUPAC name 2-(3α,7α,12α-Trihydroxy-5β-cholan-24-amido)ethane-1-sulfonic acid
- Systematic IUPAC name 2-{(4R)-4-[(1R,3aS,3bR,4R,5aS,7R,9aS,9bS,11S,11aR)-4,7,11-Trihydroxy-9a,11a-dimethylhexadecahydro-1H-cyclopenta[a]phenanthren-1-yl]pentanamido}ethane-1-sulfonic acid

Identifiers
CAS Number	81-24-3
3D model (JSmol)	Interactive image
ChEBI	CHEBI:28865
ChEMBL	ChEMBL224867
ChemSpider	6423
ECHA InfoCard	100.001.216
IUPHAR/BPS	4547
PubChem CID	6675
UNII	5E090O0G3Z
CompTox Dashboard (EPA)	DTXSID00883259
- InChI: InChI=1S/C26H45NO7S/c1-15(4-7-23(31)27-10-11-35(32,33)34)18-5-6-19-24-20(14-22(30)26(18,19)3)25(2)9-8-17(28)12-16(25)13-21(24)29/h15-22,24,28-30H,4-14H2,1-3H3,(H,27,31)(H,32,33,34)/t15-,16+,17-,18-,19+,20+,21-,22+,24+,25+,26-/m1/s1 Key: WBWWGRHZICKQGZ-HZAMXZRMSA-N; InChI=1/C26H45NO7S/c1-15(4-7-23(31)27-10-11-35(32,33)34)18-5-6-19-24-20(14-22(30)26(18,19)3)25(2)9-8-17(28)12-16(25)13-21(24)29/h15-22,24,28-30H,4-14H2,1-3H3,(H,27,31)(H,32,33,34)/t15-,16+,17-,18-,19+,20+,21-,22+,24+,25+,26-/m1/s1 Key: WBWWGRHZICKQGZ-HZAMXZRMBW
- SMILES: C[C@H](CCC(=O)NCCS(=O)(=O)O)[C@H]1CC[C@@H]2[C@@]1([C@H](C[C@H]3[C@H]2[C@@H](C[C@H]4[C@@]3(CC[C@H](C4)O)C)O)O)C

Properties
Chemical formula	C_{26}H_{45}NO_{7}S
Molar mass	515.7058 g/mol
Melting point	125.0 °C (257.0 °F; 398.1 K)
- Except where otherwise noted, data are given for materials in their standard state (at 25 °C [77 °F], 100 kPa). verify (what is ?) Infobox references

Taurocholic acid, known also as cholaic acid, cholyltaurine, or acidum cholatauricum, is a deliquescent yellowish crystalline bile acid involved in the emulsification of fats. It occurs as a sodium salt in the bile of mammals. It is a conjugate of cholic acid with taurine. In medical use, it is administered as a cholagogue and choleretic.

Hydrolysis of taurocholic acid yields taurine.

For commercial use, taurocholic acid is manufactured from cattle bile, a byproduct of the meat-processing industry.

This acid is also one of the many molecules in the body that has cholesterol as its precursor.

== Toxicity ==
The median lethal dose of taurocholic acid in newborn rats is 380 mg/kg.

== See also ==
- Deoxycholic acid
