= Mesotherapy =

Non-invasive non-surgical technique

Mesotherapy (from Greek mesos, "middle", and therapy from Greek therapeia) is a form of alternative medicine which involves intradermal or subcutaneous injections of pharmaceutical preparations, enzymes, hormones, plant extracts, vitamins, and/or other ingredients such as hyaluronic acid. It has no proven clinical efficacy and poor scientific backing. Mesotherapy injections allegedly target adipose fat cells, apparently by inducing lipolysis, rupture and cell death among adipocytes. The stated aim of mesotherapy is to provide the skin with essential nutrients, hydration, and other beneficial compounds to rejuvenate and revitalize its appearance.

The effects of the treatment may vary depending on the individual.

Pressurized mesotherapy is a needle-free method that uses an accelerated jet of air to insert the ingredients into the skin tissue. A study on the effect of using a lipolytic substance inserted with needles compared to pressurized injection showed significant fat layer reduction for both methods but even better results with the pressurized injection system.

== Usage ==
In the United States, deoxycholic acid, under the brand name Kybella, is approved by the Food and Drug Administration for reducing moderate-to-severe fat below the chin. When injected into submental fat, deoxycholic acid helps destroy adipocytes (fat cells), which are metabolized by the body over the course of several months. Deoxycholic acid has not been approved for injection elsewhere in the body.

There is no conclusive research proof that any chemical compounds work to target adipose (fat cells) specifically. Cell lysis, resulting from the detergent action of deoxycholic acid, may account for any clinical effect.

== History ==
Michel Pistor (1924–2003) performed clinical research and founded the field of mesotherapy.

The French press coined the term mesotherapy in 1958. The French Académie Nationale de Médecine recognized mesotherapy as a specialty of medicine in 1987. The French Society of Mesotherapy recognizes its use as treatment for various conditions but makes no mention of its use in plastic surgery. Popular throughout European countries and South America, mesotherapy is practiced by approximately 18,000 physicians worldwide.

== Criticism ==
Physicians have expressed concern over the efficacy of mesotherapy, arguing that the treatment hasn't been studied enough to make a determination. Mesotherapy for the treatment of cosmetic conditions hasn't been the subject of standard clinical trials; however, the procedure has been studied for pain relief for several ailments, such as tendonitis, tendon calcification, dental procedures, cancer, cervicobrachialgia, arthritis, lymphedema, and venous stasis.

Despite the lack of clinical trials, there have been case studies and medical papers written on mesotherapy as a cosmetic treatment.

Rod Rohrich, M.D., chairman of the Department of Plastic Surgery at the University of Texas Southwestern Medical Center is quoted as saying: "There is simply no data, no science and no information, to my knowledge, that mesotherapy works." The American Society of Plastic Surgeons issued a position statement not endorsing mesotherapy.

In the United States, the FDA cannot control the act of practitioners injecting various mixtures into patient's bodies, because this practice falls under the jurisdiction of state medical boards.

Robin Ashinoff, speaking for the American Academy of Dermatology, wrote "A simple injection is giving people false hope. Everybody's looking for a quick fix. But there is no quick fix for fat or fat deposits or for cellulite." The American Society for Dermatologic Surgery informed its members in February 2005 that "further study is warranted before this technique can be endorsed."

"No one says exactly what they put into the (syringe)," said Naomi Lawrence, a derma-surgeon at the University of Medicine and Dentistry of New Jersey. "One drug they often use, phosphatidylcholine, is unpredictable and causes extreme inflammation and swelling where injected. It is not a benign drug."

Mesotherapy is currently banned in a number of South American countries. Even Brazil, which tends to be less strict than the US in drug approvals, has banned the drug for these purposes.

In Australia, an alternative therapy salon was investigated by the Health Department after several clients developed skin abscesses on the calves, buttocks, thighs, abdomen, shoulders, face and neck after undergoing mesotherapy, with one patient also developing a mycobacterial infection.

Following undesirable effects observed on several patients of a French practitioner, an official ratification was published in France in April 2011 to ban mesotherapy as a method for removing fat deposits. This ban was canceled in June 2011 by the French Council of State because the investigation proved that these undesirable effects weren't due to mesotherapy itself, but were due to unhygienic conditions.

== Clinical studies ==
In a prospective study, 10 patients underwent four sessions of facial mesotherapy using multivitamins at monthly intervals. This study found that there was no clinically relevant benefit for skin rejuvenation.

Deoxycholic acid received FDA approval as an injectable to dissolve submental fat June 2015. This was based on the results of a phase III randomized trial of 2600 patients in which 68.2% of patients showed a response by measurement of the fat deposit; 81% had mild temporary adverse reactions of bruising, swelling, pain, numbness, erythema, and firmness around the treated area.
