= Ursodeoxycholic acid =

Medication and metabolite of cholesterol

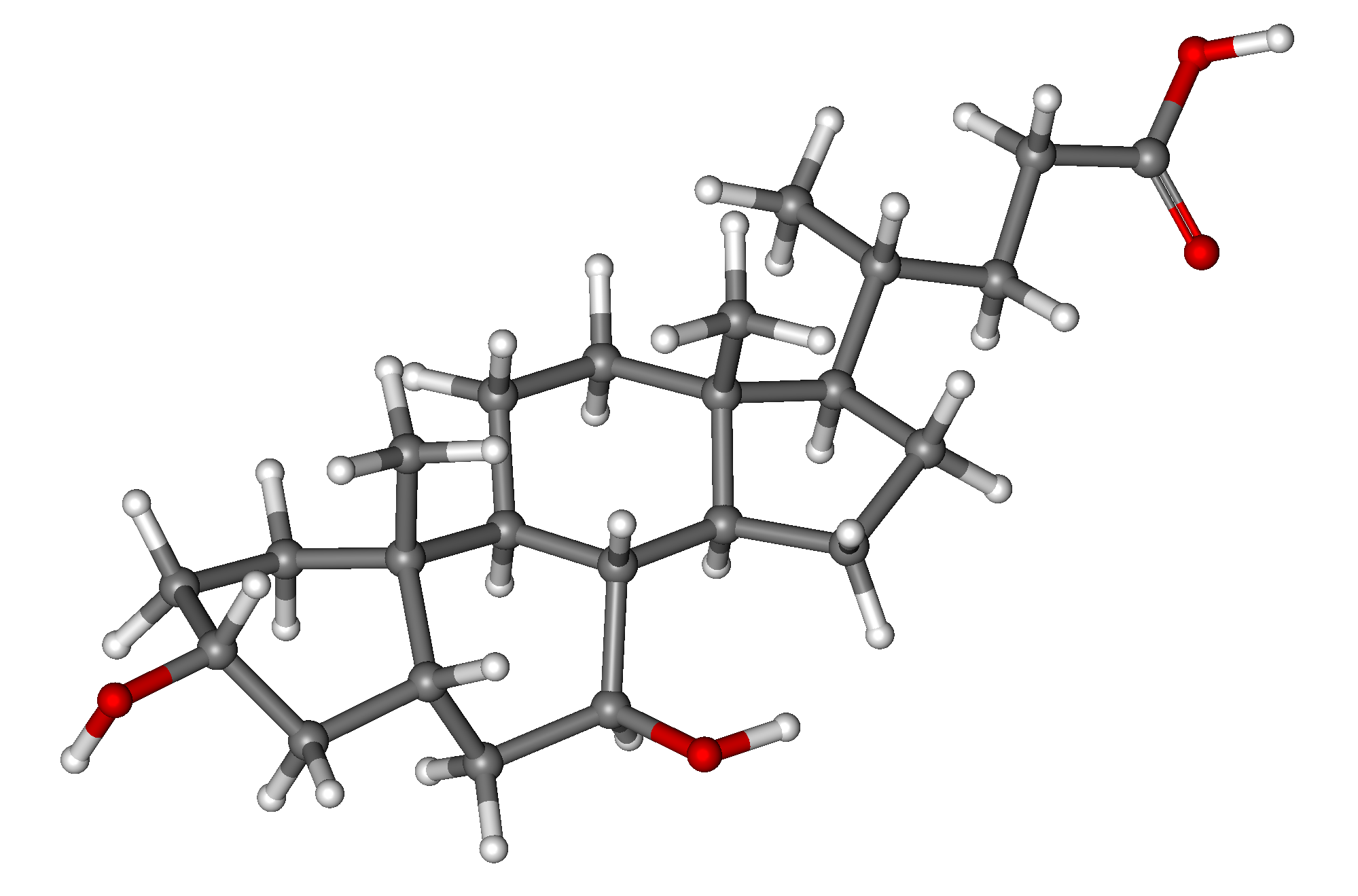

Clinical data
- Trade names: Actigall, Urso, others
- Other names: Ursodiol
- AHFS/Drugs.com: Monograph
- MedlinePlus: a699047
- License data: US DailyMed: Ursodiol
- Pregnancy category: AU: B3
- Routes of administration: By mouth
- ATC code: A05AA02 (WHO)

Legal status
- Legal status: AU: S4 (Prescription only); CA: ℞-only; UK: POM (Prescription only); US: ℞-only; In general: ℞ (Prescription only)

Identifiers
- IUPAC name: 3α,7β-dihydroxy-5β-cholan-24-oic acid OR (R)-4-((3R,5S,7S,8R,9S,10S,13R,14S,17R)-3,7-dihydroxy- 10,13-dimethylhexadecahydro- 1H-cyclopenta[a]phenanthren-17-yl)pentanoic acid
- CAS Number: 128-13-2
- PubChem CID: 31401
- IUPHAR/BPS: 7104
- DrugBank: DB01586
- ChemSpider: 29131
- UNII: 724L30Y2QR
- KEGG: D00734
- ChEBI: CHEBI:9907
- ChEMBL: ChEMBL1551
- PDB ligand: IU5 (PDBe, RCSB PDB)
- CompTox Dashboard (EPA): DTXSID6023731
- ECHA InfoCard: 100.004.437

Chemical and physical data
- Formula: C_{24}H_{40}O_{4}
- Molar mass: 392.580 g·mol^{−1}
- 3D model (JSmol): Interactive image
- Melting point: 203 °C (397 °F)
- SMILES: O=C(O)CC[C@H]([C@H]1CC[C@@H]2[C@]1(C)CC[C@H]4[C@H]2[C@@H](O)C[C@@H]3C[C@H](O)CC[C@@]34C)C
- InChI: InChI=1S/C24H40O4/c1-14(4-7-21(27)28)17-5-6-18-22-19(9-11-24(17,18)3)23(2)10-8-16(25)12-15(23)13-20(22)26/h14-20,22,25-26H,4-13H2,1-3H3,(H,27,28)/t14-,15+,16-,17-,18+,19+,20+,22+,23+,24-/m1/s1; Key:RUDATBOHQWOJDD-UZVSRGJWSA-N

Ursodeoxycholic acid (UDCA), also known as ursodiol, is a secondary bile acid, produced in humans and most other species from metabolism by intestinal bacteria. It is synthesized in the liver in some species, and was first identified in bile of bears of genus Ursus, from which its name derived. In purified form, it has been used to treat or prevent several diseases of the liver or bile ducts.

It is available as a generic medication.

== Medical uses ==
UDCA has been used as medical therapy in gallstone disease (cholelithiasis) and for biliary sludge. UDCA helps reduce the cholesterol saturation of bile and leads to gradual dissolution of cholesterol-rich gallstones.

UDCA may be given after bariatric surgery to prevent cholelithiasis, which commonly occurs due to the rapid weight loss producing biliary cholesterol oversaturation and also biliary dyskinesia secondary to hormonal changes.

=== Primary biliary cholangitis ===
UDCA is used as therapy in primary biliary cholangitis (PBC; previously known as primary biliary cirrhosis) where it can produce an improvement in biomarkers. Meta-analyses have borne out conflicting results on the mortality benefit. However analyses that exclude trials of short duration (i.e. < 2 years) have demonstrated a survival benefit and are generally considered more clinically relevant. A Cochrane systematic review in 2012 found no significant benefit in reducing mortality, the rate of liver transplantation, pruritus or fatigue. Ursodiol and obeticholic acid are FDA-approved for the treatment of primary biliary cholangitis.

=== Primary sclerosing cholangitis ===
UDCA use in primary sclerosing cholangitis is associated with improved serum liver tests that do not always correlate with improved liver disease status. WHO Drug Information advises against its use in primary sclerosing cholangitis in unapproved doses beyond 13–15 mg/kg/day.

UDCA in a dose of 28–30 mg/kg/day increases risk of death and need for liver transplant by 2.3-fold among those with primary sclerosing cholangitis, despite decrease in liver enzymes.

=== Intrahepatic cholestasis of pregnancy ===
UDCA has been used for intrahepatic cholestasis of pregnancy. UDCA lessens itching in the mother and may reduce the number of preterm births. Effects on fetal distress and other adverse outcomes are unlikely to be great.

=== Cholestasis ===
UDCA use is not licensed in children, as its safety and effectiveness have not been established. Evidence is accumulating that ursodeoxycholic acid is ineffective, unsafe and its use is associated with significant risk of morbidity and mortality in neonatal hepatitis and neonatal cholestasis.

=== Other conditions ===
UDCA has been suggested to be an adequate treatment of bile reflux gastritis.

Ursodeoxycholic acid has been used to treat cystic fibrosis related cholestasis and liver disease; however, a 2021 study aimed at evaluating whether the incidence of severe liver disease differed between CF centers routinely prescribing or not prescribing UDCA found no reduction in portal hypertension.

UDCA has been in effective in non-alcoholic fatty liver disease, in liver bile duct-paucity syndromes. It has been used as adjunct therapy in conditions with biliary tract obstruction such as biliary atresia; however liver transplant is often still required as definitive treatment for atresia. It is not effective in liver allograft rejection, and in graft-versus-host disease involving the liver.

== Adverse effects ==
Diarrhea was the most frequent adverse event seen in trial of UDCA in gallstone dissolution, occurring in 2 to 9%, which is less frequent than with chenodeoxycholic acid therapy. Bacterial conversion of UDCA to chenodeoxycholic acid may be the mechanism for this side effect. Right upper quadrant abdominal pain and exacerbation of pruritus was occasionally reported in trials in patients with PBC. Additional symptoms may include bloating, weight gain, and occasionally, thinning of hair.

== Mechanisms of action ==
=== Choleretic effects ===
Primary bile acids are produced by the liver and stored in the gall bladder. When secreted into the intestine, primary bile acids can be metabolized into secondary bile acids by intestinal bacteria. Primary and secondary bile acids help the body digest fats. Ursodeoxycholic acid helps regulate cholesterol by reducing the rate at which the intestine absorbs cholesterol molecules while breaking up micelles containing cholesterol. The drug reduces cholesterol absorption and is used to dissolve (cholesterol) gallstones in patients who want an alternative to surgery. There are multiple mechanisms involved in cholestatic liver diseases.

=== Immunomodulating effects ===
Ursodeoxycholic acid has also been shown experimentally to suppress immune response such as immune cell phagocytosis. Prolonged exposure and/or increased quantities of systemic (throughout the body, not just in the digestive system) ursodeoxycholic acid can be toxic.

=== Anti-inflammatory effects ===
Ursodeoxycholic acid has been shown to exert anti-inflammatory and protective effects in human epithelial cells of the gastrointestinal tract. It has been linked to regulation of immunoregulatory responses by regulation of cytokines, antimicrobial peptides defensins, and take an active part in increased restitution of wound in the colon. Moreover, UDCA's effects has been shown to have exert actions outside the epithelial cells.

While some bile acids are known to be colon tumor promoters (e.g. deoxycholic acid), others such as ursodeoxycholic acid are thought to be chemopreventive, perhaps by inducing cellular differentiation and/or cellular senescence in colon epithelial cells.

== Chemistry ==
Ursodeoxycholic acid is an epimer of chenodeoxycholic acid, which has similar choleretic effects and a wider species distribution. However, CDCA is not as well-tolerated in humans and it does not show immunomodulating or chemoprotective effects. Both are 7-hydroxyl derivatives of deoxycholic acid, but UDCA has the group in the beta instead of the alpha orientation.

=== Biosynthesis ===
Among mammals, only bears (Ursidae; excluding giant pandas) produce UDCA at useful amounts (>30%). It is produced in the bear liver, but the pathway remains unknown.

Other vertebrates produce UDCA in much smaller amounts by gut bacteria. CDCA is oxidized into 7-oxo-CDCA then reduced into UDCA.

=== Industrial production ===
UDCA is most commonly produced from cholic acid (CA) derived from bovine bile, a by-product of the beef industry. The current yield of this semisynthesis is about 30%.

== Society and culture ==
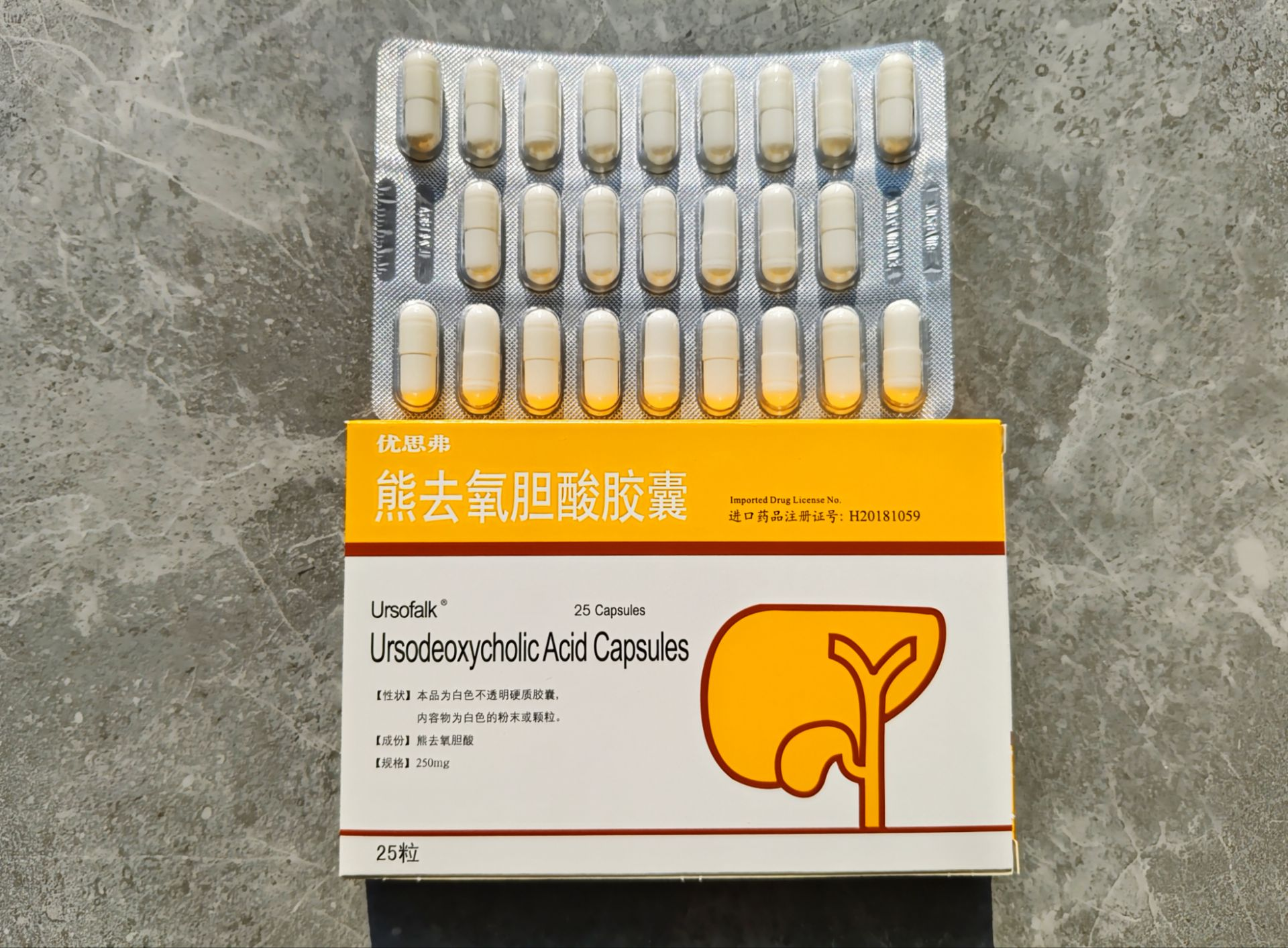
Ursodeoxycholic acid marketed in China under brand name Ursofalk

=== Names ===
The term is from the Latin noun ursus meaning bear, as bear bile contains the substance.

Ursodeoxycholic acid can be chemically synthesized and is marketed under multiple trade names, including Ursetor, Udikast, Actibile, Actigall, Biliver, Deursil, Egyurso, Heptiza 300/150, Stener, Udcasid, Udiliv, Udinorm, Udoxyl, Urso, Urso Forte, Ursocol, Ursoliv, Ursofalk, Ursosan, Ursoserinox, Udimarin, and Ursonova.

=== History ===
Bear bile, a natural source of UDCA, has been used in traditional Chinese medicine since the seventh century. Japanese scientists successfully synthesized UDCA chemically in 1955. The earliest reference to UDCA in PubMed dates to 1957 under an alternative spelling "ursodesoxycholic acid", in a small-scale clinical trial.

Ursodeoxycholic acid (application filed by Allergan) was approved for use in the United States in December 1987, and was designated an orphan drug.
