= Chenodeoxycholic acid =

One of the main bile acids

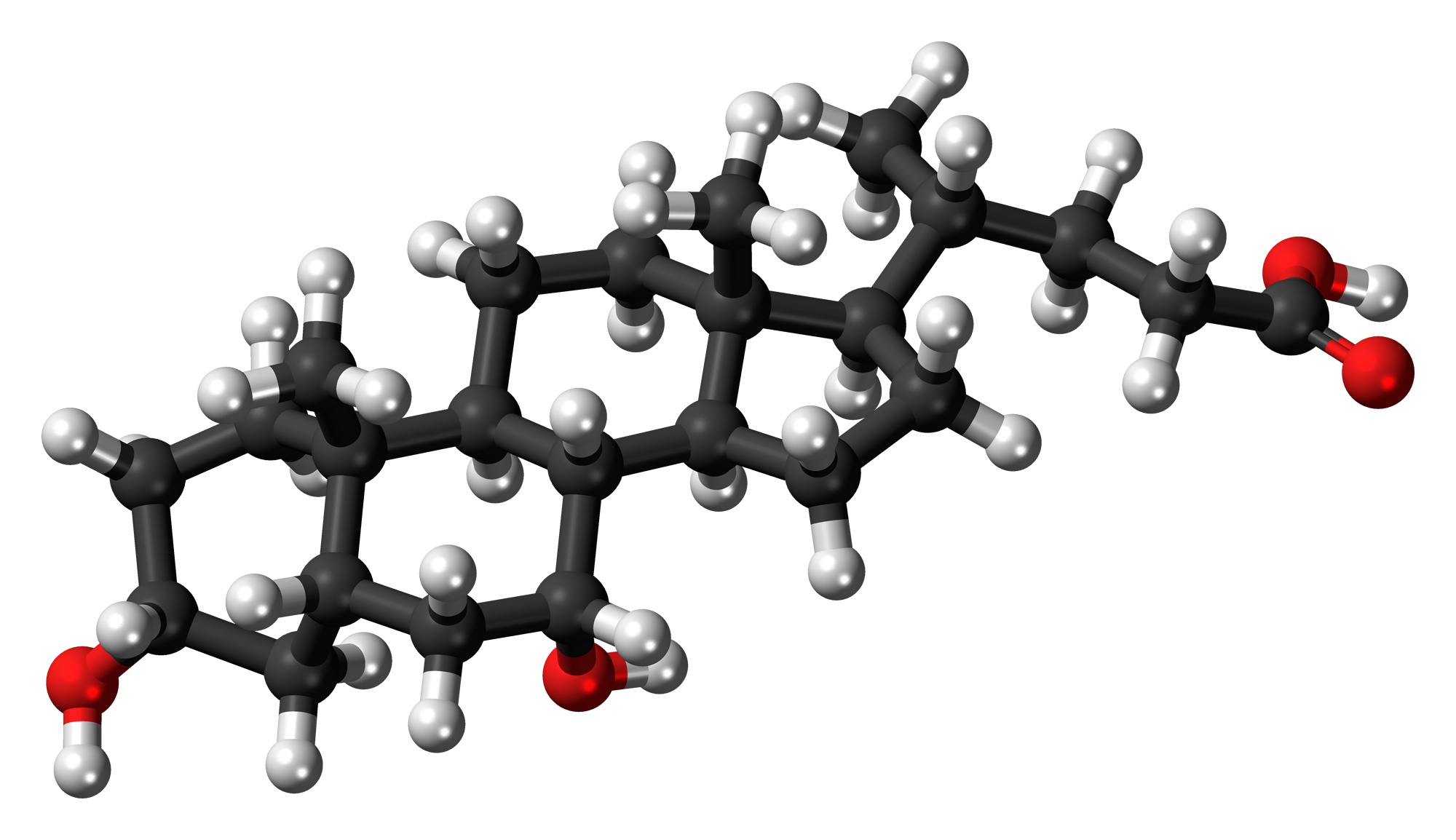

Names
- IUPAC name 3α,7α-Dihydroxy-5β-cholan-24-oic acid
- Systematic IUPAC name (4R)-4-[(1R,3aS,3bR,4R,5aS,7R,9aS,9bS,11aR)-4,7-Dihydroxy-9a,11a-dimethylhexadecahydro-1H-cyclopenta[a]phenanthren-1-yl]pentanoic acid
- Other names chenodiol, Chenix

Identifiers
CAS Number	474-25-9
3D model (JSmol)	Interactive image
ChEBI	CHEBI:16755
ChEMBL	ChEMBL240597
ChemSpider	9728
DrugBank	DB06777
ECHA InfoCard	100.006.803
EC Number	207-481-8
IUPHAR/BPS	608
KEGG	C02528
PubChem CID	10133
UNII	0GEI24LG0J
CompTox Dashboard (EPA)	DTXSID2020260
- InChI: InChI=1S/C24H40O4/c1-14(4-7-21(27)28)17-5-6-18-22-19(9-11-24(17,18)3)23(2)10-8-16(25)12-15(23)13-20(22)26/h14-20,22,25-26H,4-13H2,1-3H3,(H,27,28)/t14-,15+,16-,17-,18+,19+,20-,22+,23+,24-/m1/s1 Key: RUDATBOHQWOJDD-BSWAIDMHSA-N; InChI=1/C24H40O4/c1-14(4-7-21(27)28)17-5-6-18-22-19(9-11-24(17,18)3)23(2)10-8-16(25)12-15(23)13-20(22)26/h14-20,22,25-26H,4-13H2,1-3H3,(H,27,28)/t14-,15+,16-,17-,18+,19+,20-,22+,23+,24-/m1/s1 Key: RUDATBOHQWOJDD-BSWAIDMHBF
- SMILES: C[C@H](CCC(=O)O)[C@H]1CC[C@@H]2[C@@]1(CC[C@H]3[C@H]2[C@@H](C[C@H]4[C@@]3(CC[C@H](C4)O)C)O)C

Properties
Chemical formula	C_{24}H_{40}O_{4}
Molar mass	392.57 g/mol
Melting point	165 to 167 °C (329 to 333 °F; 438 to 440 K)

Pharmacology
ATC code	A05AA01 (WHO)
Legal status	US: ℞-only; EU: Rx-only
- Except where otherwise noted, data are given for materials in their standard state (at 25 °C [77 °F], 100 kPa). verify (what is ?) Infobox references

Chenodeoxycholic acid
Clinical data
- Trade names: Ctexli
- Other names: chenodiol (USAN US)
- AHFS/Drugs.com: Monograph
- MedlinePlus: a625044
- License data: US DailyMed: Chenodiol

Identifiers
- CompTox Dashboard (EPA): DTXSID2020260
- ECHA InfoCard: 100.006.803

Chenodeoxycholic acid (CDCA; also known as chenodesoxycholic acid, chenocholic acid and 3α,7α-dihydroxy-5β-cholan-24-oic acid) is a bile acid. Salts of this carboxylic acid are called chenodeoxycholates. Chenodeoxycholic acid is one of the main bile acids. It was first isolated from the bile of the domestic goose, which gives it the "cheno" portion of its name (Greek: χήν = goose).

== Structure ==
Chenodeoxycholic acid and cholic acid are the two primary bile acids in humans. Chenodeoxycholic acid has two hydroxyl groups and is modified with the addition of another hydroxyl group to produce cholic acid. Some other mammals have muricholic acid or deoxycholic acid rather than chenodeoxycholic acid. It occurs as a white crystalline substance insoluble in water but soluble in alcohol and acetic acid, with melting point at 165–167 °C.

== Biosynthesis and function ==
Chenodeoxycholic acid is synthesized in the liver from cholesterol via several enzymatic steps. Like other bile acids, it can be conjugated with taurine or glycine, forming taurochenodeoxycholate or glycochenodeoxycholate. Conjugation results in a lower pK_{a}. This results in the conjugated bile acids being ionized at the usual pH in the intestine, and staying in the gastrointestinal tract until reaching the ileum to be reabsorbed.

CDCA and other bile acids are surfactants forming micelles with fats, which facilitate lipid digestion. After absorption, they are taken up by the liver and resecreted, so undergoing an enterohepatic circulation. Unabsorbed CDCA can be metabolised by bacteria in the colon to form the secondary bile acid, lithocholic acid or the epimer, ursodeoxycholic acid.

CDCA is the most potent natural bile acid at stimulating the nuclear bile acid receptor, farnesoid X receptor (FXR). The transcription of many genes is activated by FXR, including those encoding FGF19 and small heterodimer partner.

== Therapeutic applications ==
In the European Union, chenodeoxycholic acid is indicated for the treatment of inborn errors of primary bile acid synthesis due to sterol 27 hydroxylase deficiency (presenting as cerebrotendinous xanthomatosis).

In the United States, chenodeoxycholic acid is indicated for people with radiolucent stones in well-opacifying gallbladders, in whom selective surgery would be undertaken except for the presence of increased surgical risk due to systemic disease or age. It is also indicated for the treatment of cerebrotendinous xanthomatosis in adults.

=== Gallstones ===
Chenodeoxycholic acid has been used as medical therapy to dissolve gallstones. Medical therapy with oral bile acids has been used in patients who have small cholesterol stones, and for patients with larger cholesterol gallstones who are unable or reluctant to have surgery. CDCA treatment can cause diarrhea, mild reversible hepatic injury, and a small increase in the plasma cholesterol level.

=== Cerebrotendinous xanthomatosis ===
Chenodeoxycholic acid can be used in the treatment of cerebrotendinous xanthomatosis.

In March 2025, chenodeoxycholic acid (Ctexli) was approved in the United States for the treatment of cerebrotendinous xanthomatosis in adults. Ctexli is the first medication approved by the US Food and Drug Administration (FDA) to treat cerebrotendinous xanthomatosis, a very rare lipid storage disease.

The most common side effects of chenodeoxycholic acid are diarrhea, headache, abdominal pain, constipation, hypertension, muscular weakness and upper respiratory tract infection.

The efficacy of chenodeoxycholic acid for the treatment of people with cerebrotendinous xanthomatosis was evaluated in a double-blind, placebo controlled, randomized crossover withdrawal trial. The 24-week trial demonstrated that treatment with chenodeoxycholic acid, 250 milligrams three times per day, resulted in significant reduction in plasma cholestanol and urine 23S-pentol (cholesterol metabolites that are markedly increased in people with cerebrotendinous xanthomatosis) compared to placebo treatment.

The US prescribing information for chenodeoxycholic acid includes a warning for liver toxicity in all people with increased risk for liver damage in people with pre-existing liver disease or bile duct abnormalities.

The FDA granted the application for chenodeoxycholic acid priority review, fast track, and orphan drug designations. The approval of Ctexli was granted to Mirum Pharmaceuticals Inc.

=== Other ===
Chenodeoxycholic acid has been used in several other conditions. As diarrhea is frequent when CDCA is used in gallstone dissolution, it has been studied as a possible treatment for constipation and has been shown to accelerate colonic transit and improve bowel function.

The Australian biotechnology company Giaconda has tested a treatment for hepatitis C infection that combines chenodeoxycholic acid with bezafibrate.

== Cancer ==
An updated systematic review and meta-analysis on the relationship of fecal bile acid concentrations to the development and progression of colorectal cancer was reported. Higher fecal concentrations of chenodeoxycholic acid were found to be associated with a higher risk and higher incidence of colorectal cancer. Bile acids may act as carcinogens in the gastrointestinal tract.
