= Lithocholic acid =

Names
- IUPAC name 3α-Hydroxy-5β-cholan-24-oic acid
- Systematic IUPAC name (4R)-4-[(1R,3aS,3bR,5aR,7R,9aS,9bS,11aR)-7-Hydroxy-9a,11a-dimethylhexadecahydro-1H-cyclopenta[a]phenanthren-1-yl]pentanoic acid
- Other names Lithocholate; Lithocolic acid; 3α-Hydroxy-5β-cholanic acid; 5β-Cholan-24-oic acid-3α-ol

Identifiers
| CAS Number | 434-13-9 |
| 3D model (JSmol) | Interactive image |
| Beilstein Reference | 3217757 |
| ChEBI | CHEBI:16325 |
| ChEMBL | ChEMBL1478 |
| ChemSpider | 9519 |
| ECHA InfoCard | 100.006.455 |
| EC Number | 207-099-1 |
| IUPHAR/BPS | 611 |
| KEGG | C03990 |
| PubChem CID | 9903 |
| RTECS number | FZ2275000 |
| UNII | 5QU0I8393U |
| CompTox Dashboard (EPA) | DTXSID6020779 |
- InChI: InChI=1S/C24H40O3/c1-15(4-9-22(26)27)19-7-8-20-18-6-5-16-14-17(25)10-12-23(16,2)21(18)11-13-24(19,20)3/h15-21,25H,4-14H2,1-3H3,(H,26,27)/t15-,16-,17-,18+,19-,20+,21+,23+,24-/m1/s1 Key: SMEROWZSTRWXGI-HVATVPOCSA-N; InChI=1/C24H40O3/c1-15(4-9-22(26)27)19-7-8-20-18-6-5-16-14-17(25)10-12-23(16,2)21(18)11-13-24(19,20)3/h15-21,25H,4-14H2,1-3H3,(H,26,27)/t15-,16-,17-,18+,19-,20+,21+,23+,24-/m1/s1 Key: SMEROWZSTRWXGI-HVATVPOCBI
- SMILES: O=C(O)CC[C@H]([C@H]1CC[C@@H]2[C@]1(C)CC[C@H]4[C@H]2CC[C@@H]3C[C@H](O)CC[C@@]34C)C

Properties
| Chemical formula | C_{24}H_{40}O_{3} |
| Molar mass | 376.581 g·mol^{−1} |
| Melting point | 183 to 188 °C (361 to 370 °F; 456 to 461 K) |
- Except where otherwise noted, data are given for materials in their standard state (at 25 °C [77 °F], 100 kPa). verify (what is ?) Infobox references

Lithocholic acid, also known as 3α-hydroxy-5β-cholan-24-oic acid or LCA, is a bile acid that acts as a detergent to solubilize fats for absorption. Bacterial action in the colon produces LCA from chenodeoxycholic acid by reduction of the hydroxyl functional group at carbon-7 in the "B" ring of the steroid framework.

It has been implicated in human and experimental animal carcinogenesis.

Dietary fiber can bind to lithocholic acid and aid in its excretion in stool; as such, fiber can protect against colon cancer.

LCA (and LCA acetate and LCA propionate) can activate the vitamin D receptor without raising calcium levels as much as vitamin D itself.

LCA binds with 20 μM affinity to the human membrane enzyme NAPE-PLD, enhancing dimer assembly and enabling catalysis. NAPE-PLD catalyzes the release of anandamide and other N-acylethanolamines (NAE) from the membrane precursor N-acylphosphatidylethanolamine (NAPE). NAPE-PLD facilitates crosstalk between bile acid signals and lipid amide signals.

LCA has been reported to have anti-aging effects in fruit flies, nematodes, and mice.
