= List of MeSH codes (D04) =

The following is a partial list of the "D" codes for Medical Subject Headings (MeSH), as defined by the United States National Library of Medicine (NLM).

This list continues the information at List of MeSH codes (D03). Codes following these are found at List of MeSH codes (D05). For other MeSH codes, see List of MeSH codes.

The source for this content is the MeSH Browser from the NLM.

== MeSH D04 – polycyclic compounds ==
=== MeSH D04.075 – bridged-ring compounds ===
==== MeSH D04.075.080 – bridged bicyclo compounds ====
- MeSH D04.075.080.500 – norbornanes
  - MeSH D04.075.080.500.234 – camphanes
  - MeSH D04.075.080.500.234.326 – camphor
  - MeSH D04.075.080.500.500 – mecamylamine
  - MeSH D04.075.080.500.795 – toxaphene

=== MeSH D04.210 – fused-ring compounds ===
==== MeSH D04.210.500 – steroids ====
- MeSH D04.210.500.054 – androstanes
  - MeSH D04.210.500.054.040 – androstanols
  - MeSH D04.210.500.054.040.080 – androstane-3,17-diol
  - MeSH D04.210.500.054.040.129 – androsterone
  - MeSH D04.210.500.054.040.248 – dihydrotestosterone
  - MeSH D04.210.500.054.040.248.450 – mesterolone
  - MeSH D04.210.500.054.040.368 – etiocholanolone
  - MeSH D04.210.500.054.040.581 – oxandrolone
  - MeSH D04.210.500.054.040.632 – oxymetholone
  - MeSH D04.210.500.054.040.685 – pancuronium
  - MeSH D04.210.500.054.040.783 – rocuronium
  - MeSH D04.210.500.054.040.881 – stanozolol
  - MeSH D04.210.500.054.040.920 – vecuronium bromide
  - MeSH D04.210.500.054.079 – androstenes
  - MeSH D04.210.500.054.079.065 – abiraterone acetate
  - MeSH D04.210.500.054.079.129 – androstadienes
  - MeSH D04.210.500.054.079.129.114 – fluticasone
  - MeSH D04.210.500.054.079.129.114.500 – fluticasone-salmeterol drug combination
  - MeSH D04.210.500.054.079.129.284 – loteprednol etabonate
  - MeSH D04.210.500.054.079.129.453 – methandrostenolone
  - MeSH D04.210.500.054.079.129.782 – testolactone
  - MeSH D04.210.500.054.079.129.891 – wortmannin
  - MeSH D04.210.500.054.079.229 – androstatrienes
  - MeSH D04.210.500.054.079.329 – androstenedione
  - MeSH D04.210.500.054.079.429 – androstenols
  - MeSH D04.210.500.054.079.429.154 – androstenediols
  - MeSH D04.210.500.054.079.429.154.050 – androstenediol
  - MeSH D04.210.500.054.079.429.154.349 – fluoxymesterone
  - MeSH D04.210.500.054.079.429.154.600 – methandriol
  - MeSH D04.210.500.054.079.429.320 – cyanoketone
  - MeSH D04.210.500.054.079.429.625 – dehydroepiandrosterone
  - MeSH D04.210.500.054.079.429.625.300 – dehydroepiandrosterone sulfate
  - MeSH D04.210.500.054.079.429.824 – testosterone
  - MeSH D04.210.500.054.079.429.824.275 – epitestosterone
  - MeSH D04.210.500.054.079.429.824.375 – hydroxytestosterones
  - MeSH D04.210.500.054.079.429.824.537 – methenolone
  - MeSH D04.210.500.054.079.429.824.664 – methyltestosterone
  - MeSH D04.210.500.054.079.429.824.832 – testosterone propionate
  - MeSH D04.210.500.054.079.500 – finasteride
- MeSH D04.210.500.105 – bile acids and salts
  - MeSH D04.210.500.105.225 – cholic acids
  - MeSH D04.210.500.105.225.130 – cholic acid
  - MeSH D04.210.500.105.225.130.330 – cholates
  - MeSH D04.210.500.105.225.130.330.850 – sodium cholate
  - MeSH D04.210.500.105.225.261 – dehydrocholic acid
  - MeSH D04.210.500.105.225.272 – deoxycholic acid
  - MeSH D04.210.500.105.225.272.150 – chenodeoxycholic acid
  - MeSH D04.210.500.105.225.272.150.350 – glycochenodeoxycholic acid
  - MeSH D04.210.500.105.225.272.150.850 – taurochenodeoxycholic acid
  - MeSH D04.210.500.105.225.272.411 – glycodeoxycholic acid
  - MeSH D04.210.500.105.225.272.411.360 – glycochenodeoxycholic acid
  - MeSH D04.210.500.105.225.272.925 – taurodeoxycholic acid
  - MeSH D04.210.500.105.225.272.925.875 – taurochenodeoxycholic acid
  - MeSH D04.210.500.105.225.272.962 – ursodeoxycholic acid
  - MeSH D04.210.500.105.225.400 – glycocholic acid
  - MeSH D04.210.500.105.225.400.380 – glycodeoxycholic acid
  - MeSH D04.210.500.105.225.400.380.360 – glycochenodeoxycholic acid
  - MeSH D04.210.500.105.225.480 – lithocholic acid
  - MeSH D04.210.500.105.225.480.880 – taurolithocholic acid
  - MeSH D04.210.500.105.225.900 – taurocholic acid
  - MeSH D04.210.500.105.225.900.900 – taurodeoxycholic acid
  - MeSH D04.210.500.105.225.900.900.870 – taurochenodeoxycholic acid
  - MeSH D04.210.500.105.225.900.920 – taurolithocholic acid
- MeSH D04.210.500.155 – cardanolides
  - MeSH D04.210.500.155.580 – cardiac glycosides
  - MeSH D04.210.500.155.580.064 – bufanolides
  - MeSH D04.210.500.155.580.064.580 – proscillaridin
  - MeSH D04.210.500.155.580.130 – cardenolides
  - MeSH D04.210.500.155.580.130.500 – digitalis glycosides
  - MeSH D04.210.500.155.580.130.500.236 – digitonin
  - MeSH D04.210.500.155.580.130.500.336 – digitoxin
  - MeSH D04.210.500.155.580.130.500.336.259 – acetyldigitoxins
  - MeSH D04.210.500.155.580.130.500.436 – digoxin
  - MeSH D04.210.500.155.580.130.500.436.050 – acetyldigoxins
  - MeSH D04.210.500.155.580.130.500.436.500 – medigoxin
  - MeSH D04.210.500.155.580.130.500.657 – lanatosides
  - MeSH D04.210.500.155.580.130.500.657.200 – deslanoside
  - MeSH D04.210.500.155.580.130.625 – digitoxin
  - MeSH D04.210.500.155.580.130.625.259 – acetyldigitoxins
  - MeSH D04.210.500.155.580.130.625.350 – digitoxigenin
  - MeSH D04.210.500.155.580.130.688 – digoxin
  - MeSH D04.210.500.155.580.130.688.050 – acetyldigoxins
  - MeSH D04.210.500.155.580.130.688.350 – digoxigenin
  - MeSH D04.210.500.155.580.130.688.500 – medigoxin
  - MeSH D04.210.500.155.580.130.750 – strophanthins
  - MeSH D04.210.500.155.580.130.750.250 – cymarine
  - MeSH D04.210.500.155.580.130.750.600 – ouabain
  - MeSH D04.210.500.155.580.130.750.800 – strophanthidin
- MeSH D04.210.500.221 – cholanes
  - MeSH D04.210.500.221.263 – cholenes
  - MeSH D04.210.500.221.430 – cholic acids
  - MeSH D04.210.500.221.430.130 – cholic acid
  - MeSH D04.210.500.221.430.130.330 – cholates
  - MeSH D04.210.500.221.430.130.330.850 – sodium cholate
  - MeSH D04.210.500.221.430.265 – dehydrocholic acid
  - MeSH D04.210.500.221.430.342 – deoxycholic acid
  - MeSH D04.210.500.221.430.342.300 – chenodeoxycholic acid
  - MeSH D04.210.500.221.430.342.300.400 – glycochenodeoxycholic acid
  - MeSH D04.210.500.221.430.342.300.900 – taurochenodeoxycholic acid
  - MeSH D04.210.500.221.430.342.400 – glycodeoxycholic acid
  - MeSH D04.210.500.221.430.342.400.450 – glycochenodeoxycholic acid
  - MeSH D04.210.500.221.430.342.900 – taurodeoxycholic acid
  - MeSH D04.210.500.221.430.342.900.910 – taurochenodeoxycholic acid
  - MeSH D04.210.500.221.430.342.925 – ursodeoxycholic acid
  - MeSH D04.210.500.221.430.484 – glycocholic acid
  - MeSH D04.210.500.221.430.484.430 – glycodeoxycholic acid
  - MeSH D04.210.500.221.430.484.430.420 – glycochenodeoxycholic acid
  - MeSH D04.210.500.221.430.622 – lithocholic acid
  - MeSH D04.210.500.221.430.622.900 – taurolithocholic acid
  - MeSH D04.210.500.221.430.873 – taurocholic acid
  - MeSH D04.210.500.221.430.873.920 – taurodeoxycholic acid
  - MeSH D04.210.500.221.430.873.920.900 – taurochenodeoxycholic acid
  - MeSH D04.210.500.221.430.873.940 – taurolithocholic acid
- MeSH D04.210.500.247 – cholestanes
  - MeSH D04.210.500.247.100 – cholestanols
  - MeSH D04.210.500.247.100.250 – cholestanol
  - MeSH D04.210.500.247.125 – cholestanones
  - MeSH D04.210.500.247.222 – cholestenes
  - MeSH D04.210.500.247.222.159 – cholecalciferol
  - MeSH D04.210.500.247.222.159.478 – hydroxycholecalciferols
  - MeSH D04.210.500.247.222.159.478.250 – calcifediol
  - MeSH D04.210.500.247.222.159.478.387 – dihydroxycholecalciferols
  - MeSH D04.210.500.247.222.159.478.387.300 – calcitriol
  - MeSH D04.210.500.247.222.159.478.387.400 – 24,25-dihydroxyvitamin d 3
  - MeSH D04.210.500.247.222.222 – cholestadienes
  - MeSH D04.210.500.247.222.222.347 – cholestadienols
  - MeSH D04.210.500.247.222.222.347.200 – dehydrocholesterols
  - MeSH D04.210.500.247.222.222.347.231 – desmosterol
  - MeSH D04.210.500.247.222.222.347.389 – fusidic acid
  - MeSH D04.210.500.247.222.222.347.557 – lanosterol
  - MeSH D04.210.500.247.222.222.347.833 – stigmasterol
  - MeSH D04.210.500.247.222.265 – cholestenones
  - MeSH D04.210.500.247.222.265.165 – ecdysteroids
  - MeSH D04.210.500.247.222.265.165.500 – ecdysone
  - MeSH D04.210.500.247.222.265.165.750 – ecdysterone
  - MeSH D04.210.500.247.222.265.450 – ketocholesterols
  - MeSH D04.210.500.247.222.284 – cholesterol
  - MeSH D04.210.500.247.222.284.070 – azacosterol
  - MeSH D04.210.500.247.222.284.200 – cholesterol esters
  - MeSH D04.210.500.247.222.284.510 – 19-iodocholesterol
  - MeSH D04.210.500.247.222.284.800 – oxysterols
  - MeSH D04.210.500.247.222.284.800.500 – hydroxycholesterols
  - MeSH D04.210.500.247.222.284.800.750 – ketocholesterols
  - MeSH D04.210.500.247.222.474 – ergocalciferols
  - MeSH D04.210.500.247.222.474.250 – dihydrotachysterol
  - MeSH D04.210.500.247.222.474.400 – 25-hydroxyvitamin d 2
  - MeSH D04.210.500.247.222.537 – ergosterol
  - MeSH D04.210.500.247.222.537.888 – withanolides
  - MeSH D04.210.500.247.222.857 – sitosterols
  - MeSH D04.210.500.247.515 – spirostans
  - MeSH D04.210.500.247.515.500 – diosgenin
  - MeSH D04.210.500.247.515.500.500 – solanine
  - MeSH D04.210.500.247.808 – sterols
  - MeSH D04.210.500.247.808.050 – adosterol
  - MeSH D04.210.500.247.808.146 – cholecalciferol
  - MeSH D04.210.500.247.808.146.478 – hydroxycholecalciferols
  - MeSH D04.210.500.247.808.146.478.250 – calcifediol
  - MeSH D04.210.500.247.808.146.478.387 – dihydroxycholecalciferols
  - MeSH D04.210.500.247.808.146.478.387.300 – calcitriol
  - MeSH D04.210.500.247.808.146.478.387.400 – 24,25-dihydroxyvitamin d 3
  - MeSH D04.210.500.247.808.197 – cholesterol
  - MeSH D04.210.500.247.808.197.070 – azacosterol
  - MeSH D04.210.500.247.808.197.135 – cholestanol
  - MeSH D04.210.500.247.808.197.200 – cholesterol esters
  - MeSH D04.210.500.247.808.197.225 – cholesterol, dietary
  - MeSH D04.210.500.247.808.197.238 – cholesterol, hdl
  - MeSH D04.210.500.247.808.197.244 – cholesterol, ldl
  - MeSH D04.210.500.247.808.197.247 – cholesterol, vldl
  - MeSH D04.210.500.247.808.197.250 – dehydrocholesterols
  - MeSH D04.210.500.247.808.197.250.281 – desmosterol
  - MeSH D04.210.500.247.808.197.580 – 19-iodocholesterol
  - MeSH D04.210.500.247.808.197.800 – oxysterols
  - MeSH D04.210.500.247.808.197.800.500 – hydroxycholesterols
  - MeSH D04.210.500.247.808.197.800.750 – ketocholesterols
  - MeSH D04.210.500.247.808.412 – ergocalciferols
  - MeSH D04.210.500.247.808.412.250 – dihydrotachysterol
  - MeSH D04.210.500.247.808.412.400 – 25-hydroxyvitamin d 2
  - MeSH D04.210.500.247.808.489 – fusidic acid
  - MeSH D04.210.500.247.808.607 – lanosterol
  - MeSH D04.210.500.247.808.756 – phytosterols
  - MeSH D04.210.500.247.808.756.071 – brassinosteroids
  - MeSH D04.210.500.247.808.756.143 – ecdysteroids
  - MeSH D04.210.500.247.808.756.669 – sitosterols
  - MeSH D04.210.500.247.808.756.808 – stigmasterol
  - MeSH D04.210.500.247.808.756.904 – withanolides
  - MeSH D04.210.500.247.808.874 – solanine
- MeSH D04.210.500.294 – cyclosteroids
- MeSH D04.210.500.365 – estranes
  - MeSH D04.210.500.365.415 – estrenes
  - MeSH D04.210.500.365.415.050 – allylestrenol
  - MeSH D04.210.500.365.415.200 – epimestrol
  - MeSH D04.210.500.365.415.215 – equilenin
  - MeSH D04.210.500.365.415.220 – equilin
  - MeSH D04.210.500.365.415.248 – estradiol
  - MeSH D04.210.500.365.415.248.320 – estramustine
  - MeSH D04.210.500.365.415.248.660 – fulvestrant
  - MeSH D04.210.500.365.415.248.830 – 2-methoxyestradiol
  - MeSH D04.210.500.365.415.331 – estriol
  - MeSH D04.210.500.365.415.331.320 – estetrol
  - MeSH D04.210.500.365.415.414 – estrone
  - MeSH D04.210.500.365.415.414.400 – hydroxyestrones
  - MeSH D04.210.500.365.415.550 – metribolone
  - MeSH D04.210.500.365.415.580 – mifepristone
  - MeSH D04.210.500.365.415.638 – nandrolone
  - MeSH D04.210.500.365.415.638.500 – nandrolone decanoate
  - MeSH D04.210.500.365.415.930 – trenbolone acetate
- MeSH D04.210.500.451 – gonanes
- MeSH D04.210.500.496 – homosteroids
  - MeSH D04.210.500.496.699 – testolactone
- MeSH D04.210.500.528 – hydroxysteroids
- MeSH D04.210.500.578 – ketosteroids
  - MeSH D04.210.500.578.502 – 17-ketosteroids
  - MeSH D04.210.500.578.502.112 – androstenedione
  - MeSH D04.210.500.578.502.195 – androsterone
  - MeSH D04.210.500.578.502.400 – dehydroepiandrosterone
  - MeSH D04.210.500.578.502.400.300 – dehydroepiandrosterone sulfate
  - MeSH D04.210.500.578.502.470 – equilenin
  - MeSH D04.210.500.578.502.475 – equilin
  - MeSH D04.210.500.578.502.497 – estrone
  - MeSH D04.210.500.578.502.497.400 – hydroxyestrones
  - MeSH D04.210.500.578.502.583 – etiocholanolone
- MeSH D04.210.500.625 – neurosteroids
- MeSH D04.210.500.668 – norsteroids
  - MeSH D04.210.500.668.100 – norandrostanes
  - MeSH D04.210.500.668.651 – norpregnanes
  - MeSH D04.210.500.668.651.443 – norpregnadienes
  - MeSH D04.210.500.668.651.443.680 – promegestone
  - MeSH D04.210.500.668.651.568 – norpregnatrienes
  - MeSH D04.210.500.668.651.568.291 – ethinyl estradiol
  - MeSH D04.210.500.668.651.568.291.250 – ethinyl estradiol-norgestrel combination
  - MeSH D04.210.500.668.651.568.291.500 – mestranol
  - MeSH D04.210.500.668.651.568.291.750 – quinestrol
  - MeSH D04.210.500.668.651.568.620 – norgestrienone
  - MeSH D04.210.500.668.651.568.620.400 – gestrinone
  - MeSH D04.210.500.668.651.693 – norpregnenes
  - MeSH D04.210.500.668.651.693.175 – desogestrel
  - MeSH D04.210.500.668.651.693.223 – ethylestrenol
  - MeSH D04.210.500.668.651.693.279 – ethynodiol diacetate
  - MeSH D04.210.500.668.651.693.362 – gestonorone caproate
  - MeSH D04.210.500.668.651.693.494 – lynestrenol
  - MeSH D04.210.500.668.651.693.595 – norethandrolone
  - MeSH D04.210.500.668.651.693.651 – norethindrone
  - MeSH D04.210.500.668.651.693.651.500 – norethindrone acetate
  - MeSH D04.210.500.668.651.693.706 – norethynodrel
  - MeSH D04.210.500.668.651.693.762 – norgestrel
  - MeSH D04.210.500.668.651.693.762.225 – ethinyl estradiol-norgestrel combination
  - MeSH D04.210.500.668.651.693.762.450 – levonorgestrel
  - MeSH D04.210.500.668.651.693.820 – norprogesterones
- MeSH D04.210.500.745 – pregnanes
  - MeSH D04.210.500.745.432 – pregnadienes
  - MeSH D04.210.500.745.432.100 – canrenoic acid
  - MeSH D04.210.500.745.432.120 – canrenone
  - MeSH D04.210.500.745.432.144 – chlormadinone acetate
  - MeSH D04.210.500.745.432.219 – cyproterone
  - MeSH D04.210.500.745.432.219.150 – cyproterone acetate
  - MeSH D04.210.500.745.432.235 – danazol
  - MeSH D04.210.500.745.432.296 – dydrogesterone
  - MeSH D04.210.500.745.432.370 – fluocinolone acetonide
  - MeSH D04.210.500.745.432.370.325 – fluocinonide
  - MeSH D04.210.500.745.432.481 – medrogestone
  - MeSH D04.210.500.745.432.531 – megestrol
  - MeSH D04.210.500.745.432.531.500 – megestrol acetate
  - MeSH D04.210.500.745.432.581 – melengestrol acetate
  - MeSH D04.210.500.745.432.719 – pregnadienediols
  - MeSH D04.210.500.745.432.719.260 – desoximetasone
  - MeSH D04.210.500.745.432.719.320 – fluocortolone
  - MeSH D04.210.500.745.432.719.320.250 – diflucortolone
  - MeSH D04.210.500.745.432.719.349 – fluorometholone
  - MeSH D04.210.500.745.432.719.526 – mometasone furoate
  - MeSH D04.210.500.745.432.719.526.500 – mometasone furoate, formoterol fumarate drug combination
  - MeSH D04.210.500.745.432.719.702 – prednisone
  - MeSH D04.210.500.745.432.769 – pregnadienetriols
  - MeSH D04.210.500.745.432.769.125 – beclomethasone
  - MeSH D04.210.500.745.432.769.199 – betamethasone
  - MeSH D04.210.500.745.432.769.199.150 – betamethasone valerate
  - MeSH D04.210.500.745.432.769.325 – desonide
  - MeSH D04.210.500.745.432.769.344 – dexamethasone
  - MeSH D04.210.500.745.432.769.344.300 – dexamethasone isonicotinate
  - MeSH D04.210.500.745.432.769.344.650 – tobramycin, dexamethasone drug combination
  - MeSH D04.210.500.745.432.769.465 – flumethasone
  - MeSH D04.210.500.745.432.769.692 – paramethasone
  - MeSH D04.210.500.745.432.769.795 – prednisolone
  - MeSH D04.210.500.745.432.769.795.307 – fluprednisolone
  - MeSH D04.210.500.745.432.769.795.539 – methylprednisolone
  - MeSH D04.210.500.745.432.769.795.539.250 – methylprednisolone acetate
  - MeSH D04.210.500.745.432.769.795.539.500 – methylprednisolone hemisuccinate
  - MeSH D04.210.500.745.432.769.795.700 – prednimustine
  - MeSH D04.210.500.745.432.915 – triamcinolone
  - MeSH D04.210.500.745.432.915.715 – triamcinolone acetonide
  - MeSH D04.210.500.745.495 – pregnanediol
  - MeSH D04.210.500.745.558 – pregnanediones
  - MeSH D04.210.500.745.558.050 – alfaxalone alfadolone mixture
  - MeSH D04.210.500.745.558.075 – 5-alpha-dihydroprogesterone
  - MeSH D04.210.500.745.558.783 – tetrahydrocortisone
  - MeSH D04.210.500.745.620 – pregnanetriol
  - MeSH D04.210.500.745.640 – pregnanolone
  - MeSH D04.210.500.745.683 – pregnatrienes
  - MeSH D04.210.500.745.745 – pregnenes
  - MeSH D04.210.500.745.745.183 – cortisone
  - MeSH D04.210.500.745.745.279 – dimethisterone
  - MeSH D04.210.500.745.745.329 – eplerenone
  - MeSH D04.210.500.745.745.379 – ethisterone
  - MeSH D04.210.500.745.745.654 – pregnenediones
  - MeSH D04.210.500.745.745.654.062 – aldosterone
  - MeSH D04.210.500.745.745.654.105 – budesonide
  - MeSH D04.210.500.745.745.654.105.500 – budesonide, formoterol fumarate drug combination
  - MeSH D04.210.500.745.745.654.237 – corticosterone
  - MeSH D04.210.500.745.745.654.237.400 – 18-hydroxycorticosterone
  - MeSH D04.210.500.745.745.654.252 – cortodoxone
  - MeSH D04.210.500.745.745.654.339 – desoxycorticosterone
  - MeSH D04.210.500.745.745.654.339.400 – 18-hydroxydesoxycorticosterone
  - MeSH D04.210.500.745.745.654.339.700 – desoxycorticosterone acetate
  - MeSH D04.210.500.745.745.654.473 – flurandrenolone
  - MeSH D04.210.500.745.745.654.485 – flurogestone acetate
  - MeSH D04.210.500.745.745.654.527 – gestonorone caproate
  - MeSH D04.210.500.745.745.654.570 – halcinonide
  - MeSH D04.210.500.745.745.654.600 – hydrocortisone
  - MeSH D04.210.500.745.745.654.600.500 – fludrocortisone
  - MeSH D04.210.500.745.745.654.829 – progesterone
  - MeSH D04.210.500.745.745.654.829.025 – algestone
  - MeSH D04.210.500.745.745.654.829.025.025 – algestone acetophenide
  - MeSH D04.210.500.745.745.654.829.100 – 20-alpha-dihydroprogesterone
  - MeSH D04.210.500.745.745.654.829.395 – hydroxyprogesterones
  - MeSH D04.210.500.745.745.654.829.395.400 – 17-alpha-hydroxyprogesterone
  - MeSH D04.210.500.745.745.654.829.395.400.500 – 17 alpha-hydroxyprogesterone caproate
  - MeSH D04.210.500.745.745.654.829.395.700 – medroxyprogesterone
  - MeSH D04.210.500.745.745.654.829.395.700.500 – medroxyprogesterone acetate
  - MeSH D04.210.500.745.745.725 – pregnenolone
  - MeSH D04.210.500.745.745.725.395 – 17-alpha-hydroxypregnenolone
  - MeSH D04.210.500.745.745.725.703 – pregnenolone carbonitrile
  - MeSH D04.210.500.745.745.855 – spironolactone
  - MeSH D04.210.500.745.887 – tetrahydrocortisol
- MeSH D04.210.500.795 – sapogenins
- MeSH D04.210.500.812 – secosteroids
  - MeSH D04.210.500.812.768 – vitamin d
  - MeSH D04.210.500.812.768.196 – cholecalciferol
  - MeSH D04.210.500.812.768.196.478 – hydroxycholecalciferols
  - MeSH D04.210.500.812.768.196.478.250 – calcifediol
  - MeSH D04.210.500.812.768.196.478.387 – dihydroxycholecalciferols
  - MeSH D04.210.500.812.768.196.478.387.300 – calcitriol
  - MeSH D04.210.500.812.768.196.478.387.400 – 24,25-dihydroxyvitamin d 3
  - MeSH D04.210.500.812.768.462 – ergocalciferols
  - MeSH D04.210.500.812.768.462.250 – dihydrotachysterol
  - MeSH D04.210.500.812.768.462.400 – 25-hydroxyvitamin d 2
- MeSH D04.210.500.875 – steroids, brominated
- MeSH D04.210.500.883 – steroids, chlorinated
  - MeSH D04.210.500.883.154 – beclomethasone
  - MeSH D04.210.500.883.294 – chlormadinone acetate
  - MeSH D04.210.500.883.419 – cyproterone
  - MeSH D04.210.500.883.419.150 – cyproterone acetate
- MeSH D04.210.500.908 – steroids, fluorinated
  - MeSH D04.210.500.908.093 – betamethasone
  - MeSH D04.210.500.908.093.150 – betamethasone valerate
  - MeSH D04.210.500.908.093.250 – clobetasol
  - MeSH D04.210.500.908.238 – dexamethasone
  - MeSH D04.210.500.908.238.250 – desoximetasone
  - MeSH D04.210.500.908.238.300 – dexamethasone isonicotinate
  - MeSH D04.210.500.908.238.650 – tobramycin, dexamethasone drug combination
  - MeSH D04.210.500.908.359 – flumethasone
  - MeSH D04.210.500.908.394 – fluocinolone acetonide
  - MeSH D04.210.500.908.394.300 – fluocinonide
  - MeSH D04.210.500.908.405 – fluocortolone
  - MeSH D04.210.500.908.405.250 – diflucortolone
  - MeSH D04.210.500.908.431 – fluorometholone
  - MeSH D04.210.500.908.466 – fluoxymesterone
  - MeSH D04.210.500.908.502 – fluprednisolone
  - MeSH D04.210.500.908.537 – flurandrenolone
  - MeSH D04.210.500.908.550 – flurogestone acetate
  - MeSH D04.210.500.908.727 – paramethasone
  - MeSH D04.210.500.908.891 – triamcinolone
  - MeSH D04.210.500.908.891.927 – triamcinolone acetonide
- MeSH D04.210.500.925 – steroids, heterocyclic
  - MeSH D04.210.500.925.100 – azasteroids
  - MeSH D04.210.500.925.100.125 – dutasteride
  - MeSH D04.210.500.925.100.250 – finasteride

=== MeSH D04.345 – macrocyclic compounds ===
==== MeSH D04.345.051 – crown compounds ====
- MeSH D04.345.051.500 – crown ethers

==== MeSH D04.345.103 – cyclodextrins ====
- MeSH D04.345.103.222 – alpha-cyclodextrins
- MeSH D04.345.103.333 – beta-cyclodextrins
  - MeSH D04.345.103.333.500 – 2-hydroxypropyl-beta-cyclodextrin
- MeSH D04.345.103.444 – gamma-cyclodextrins
  - MeSH D04.345.103.444.500 – sugammadex

==== MeSH D04.345.241 – ethers, cyclic ====
- MeSH D04.345.241.308 – crown ethers
- MeSH D04.345.241.654 – polyether polyketides
  - MeSH D04.345.241.654.063 – amphidinols
  - MeSH D04.345.241.654.125 – calcimycin
  - MeSH D04.345.241.654.188 – ciguatoxins
  - MeSH D04.345.241.654.250 – lasalocid
  - MeSH D04.345.241.654.500 – monensin
  - MeSH D04.345.241.654.750 – nigericin
  - MeSH D04.345.241.654.937 – polyether toxins
  - MeSH D04.345.241.654.937.250 – bryostatins
  - MeSH D04.345.241.654.937.500 – ciguatoxins
  - MeSH D04.345.241.654.937.750 – okadaic acid

==== MeSH D04.345.295 – lactams, macrocyclic ====
- MeSH D04.345.295.500 – maytansine
  - MeSH D04.345.295.500.500 – ado-trastuzumab emtansine
- MeSH D04.345.295.750 – rifamycins
  - MeSH D04.345.295.750.650 – rifabutin
  - MeSH D04.345.295.750.650.700 – streptovaricin
  - MeSH D04.345.295.750.700 – rifampin
  - MeSH D04.345.295.750.850 – rifaximin

==== MeSH D04.345.566 – peptides, cyclic ====
- MeSH D04.345.566.040 – alamethicin
- MeSH D04.345.566.050 – amanitins
  - MeSH D04.345.566.050.111 – alpha-amanitin
- MeSH D04.345.566.075 – bacitracin
- MeSH D04.345.566.142 – capreomycin
- MeSH D04.345.566.235 – cyclosporins
  - MeSH D04.345.566.235.300 – cyclosporine
- MeSH D04.345.566.252 – dactinomycin
- MeSH D04.345.566.270 – daptomycin
- MeSH D04.345.566.297 – depsipeptides
  - MeSH D04.345.566.297.250 – echinomycin
  - MeSH D04.345.566.297.500 – valinomycin
- MeSH D04.345.566.352 – enterobactin
- MeSH D04.345.566.380 – ferrichrome
- MeSH D04.345.566.447 – microcystins
- MeSH D04.345.566.515 – mycobacillin
- MeSH D04.345.566.582 – nisin
- MeSH D04.345.566.650 – octreotide
- MeSH D04.345.566.735 – phalloidine
- MeSH D04.345.566.780 – polymyxins
  - MeSH D04.345.566.780.110 – colistin
  - MeSH D04.345.566.780.750 – polymyxin b
- MeSH D04.345.566.802 – streptogramins
  - MeSH D04.345.566.802.249 – mikamycin
  - MeSH D04.345.566.802.374 – pristinamycin
  - MeSH D04.345.566.802.500 – streptogramin group a
  - MeSH D04.345.566.802.500.500 – streptogramin a
  - MeSH D04.345.566.802.750 – streptogramin group b
  - MeSH D04.345.566.802.750.500 – streptogramin b
  - MeSH D04.345.566.802.812 – vernamycin b
  - MeSH D04.345.566.802.875 – virginiamycin
  - MeSH D04.345.566.802.875.500 – streptogramin a
- MeSH D04.345.566.825 – thiostrepton
- MeSH D04.345.566.850 – tyrothricin
  - MeSH D04.345.566.850.300 – gramicidin
  - MeSH D04.345.566.850.920 – tyrocidine
- MeSH D04.345.566.875 – viomycin
  - MeSH D04.345.566.875.250 – enviomycin

==== MeSH D04.345.674 – polyketides ====
- MeSH D04.345.674.250 – acetogenins
- MeSH D04.345.674.313 – angucyclines and angucyclinones
- MeSH D04.345.674.375 – benzoisochromanequinones
- MeSH D04.345.674.500 – macrolides
  - MeSH D04.345.674.500.250 – amphidinolides
  - MeSH D04.345.674.500.500 – fidaxomicin
- MeSH D04.345.674.625 – polyether polyketides
  - MeSH D04.345.674.625.063 – amphidinols
  - MeSH D04.345.674.625.125 – calcimycin
  - MeSH D04.345.674.625.188 – ciguatoxins
  - MeSH D04.345.674.625.250 – lasalocid
  - MeSH D04.345.674.625.500 – monensin
  - MeSH D04.345.674.625.750 – nigericin
  - MeSH D04.345.674.625.937 – polyether toxins
  - MeSH D04.345.674.625.937.250 – bryostatins
  - MeSH D04.345.674.625.937.500 – ciguatoxins
  - MeSH D04.345.674.625.937.750 – okadaic acid
- MeSH D04.345.674.750 – pradimicins and benanomicins

==== MeSH D04.345.783 – tetrapyrroles ====
- MeSH D04.345.783.249 – bile pigments
  - MeSH D04.345.783.249.184 – bilirubin
  - MeSH D04.345.783.249.184.200 – biliverdine
  - MeSH D04.345.783.249.727 – urobilin
  - MeSH D04.345.783.249.852 – urobilinogen
- MeSH D04.345.783.374 – chlorophyll
  - MeSH D04.345.783.374.100 – bacteriochlorophylls
  - MeSH D04.345.783.374.140 – chlorophyll a
  - MeSH D04.345.783.374.180 – chlorophyllides
  - MeSH D04.345.783.374.700 – pheophytins
  - MeSH D04.345.783.374.725 – protochlorophyllide
- MeSH D04.345.783.437 – corrinoids
  - MeSH D04.345.783.437.777 – vitamin b 12
  - MeSH D04.345.783.437.777.270 – cobamides
  - MeSH D04.345.783.437.777.560 – hydroxocobalamin
- MeSH D04.345.783.468 – phycobilins
- MeSH D04.345.783.500 – porphyrins
  - MeSH D04.345.783.500.250 – coproporphyrins
  - MeSH D04.345.783.500.280 – deuteroporphyrins
  - MeSH D04.345.783.500.340 – etioporphyrins
  - MeSH D04.345.783.500.462 – hematoporphyrins
  - MeSH D04.345.783.500.462.400 – hematoporphyrin derivative
  - MeSH D04.345.783.500.462.400.200 – dihematoporphyrin ether
  - MeSH D04.345.783.500.620 – mesoporphyrins
  - MeSH D04.345.783.500.640 – metalloporphyrins
  - MeSH D04.345.783.500.640.587 – heme
  - MeSH D04.345.783.500.640.587.462 – hemin
  - MeSH D04.345.783.500.700 – porphyrinogens
  - MeSH D04.345.783.500.700.250 – coproporphyrinogens
  - MeSH D04.345.783.500.700.900 – uroporphyrinogens
  - MeSH D04.345.783.500.725 – protoporphyrins
  - MeSH D04.345.783.500.880 – uroporphyrins
  - MeSH D04.345.783.500.940 – verteporfin

==== MeSH D04.345.891 – trichothecenes ====
- MeSH D04.345.891.900 – trichodermin
- MeSH D04.345.891.950 – trichothecenes, type a
  - MeSH D04.345.891.950.500 – t-2 toxin
- MeSH D04.345.891.963 – trichothecenes, type b
- MeSH D04.345.891.975 – trichothecenes, type c

=== MeSH D04.615 – polycyclic aromatic hydrocarbons ===
==== MeSH D04.615.125 – anthracenes ====
- MeSH D04.615.125.380 – anthrones
  - MeSH D04.615.125.380.500 – anthralin
  - MeSH D04.615.125.380.625 – anthraquinones
  - MeSH D04.615.125.380.625.200 – carmine
  - MeSH D04.615.125.380.625.353 – emodin
  - MeSH D04.615.125.380.625.500 – mitoxantrone
  - MeSH D04.615.125.380.625.750 – senna extract
  - MeSH D04.615.125.380.625.750.500 – sennosides
- MeSH D04.615.125.600 – maprotiline
- MeSH D04.615.125.800 – perylene

==== MeSH D04.615.149 – benz(a)anthracenes ====
- MeSH D04.615.149.301 – 9,10-dimethyl-1,2-benzanthracene
- MeSH D04.615.149.401 – angucyclines and angucyclinones
- MeSH D04.615.149.500 – methylcholanthrene

==== MeSH D04.615.181 – benzocycloheptenes ====
- MeSH D04.615.181.384 – dibenzocycloheptenes
  - MeSH D04.615.181.384.100 – amitriptyline
  - MeSH D04.615.181.384.230 – butaclamol
  - MeSH D04.615.181.384.340 – cyproheptadine
  - MeSH D04.615.181.384.340.500 – loratadine
  - MeSH D04.615.181.384.380 – dizocilpine maleate
  - MeSH D04.615.181.384.535 – nortriptyline
  - MeSH D04.615.181.384.650 – protriptyline

==== MeSH D04.615.389 – fluorenes ====
- MeSH D04.615.389.050 – 2-acetylaminofluorene
  - MeSH D04.615.389.050.060 – acetoxyacetylaminofluorene
  - MeSH D04.615.389.050.400 – hydroxyacetylaminofluorene
- MeSH D04.615.389.650 – lumefantrine
  - MeSH D04.615.389.650.500 – artemether, lumefantrine drug combination
- MeSH D04.615.389.850 – tilorone

==== MeSH D04.615.486 – indenes ====
- MeSH D04.615.486.250 – dimethindene
- MeSH D04.615.486.487 – indans
  - MeSH D04.615.486.487.060 – aprindine
  - MeSH D04.615.486.487.280 – donepezil
  - MeSH D04.615.486.487.500 – ninhydrin
  - MeSH D04.615.486.487.750 – phenindione
- MeSH D04.615.486.875 – sulindac

==== MeSH D04.615.562 – naphthacenes ====
- MeSH D04.615.562.050 – anthracyclines
  - MeSH D04.615.562.050.050 – aclarubicin
  - MeSH D04.615.562.050.200 – daunorubicin
  - MeSH D04.615.562.050.200.150 – carubicin
  - MeSH D04.615.562.050.200.175 – doxorubicin
  - MeSH D04.615.562.050.200.175.200 – epirubicin
  - MeSH D04.615.562.050.200.300 – idarubicin
  - MeSH D04.615.562.050.200.650 – nogalamycin
  - MeSH D04.615.562.050.200.650.500 – menogaril
  - MeSH D04.615.562.050.650 – plicamycin
  - MeSH D04.615.562.050.825 – pradimicins and benanomicins
- MeSH D04.615.562.900 – tetracyclines
  - MeSH D04.615.562.900.146 – chlortetracycline
  - MeSH D04.615.562.900.185 – demeclocycline
  - MeSH D04.615.562.900.200 – doxycycline
  - MeSH D04.615.562.900.450 – lymecycline
  - MeSH D04.615.562.900.525 – methacycline
  - MeSH D04.615.562.900.550 – minocycline
  - MeSH D04.615.562.900.600 – oxytetracycline
  - MeSH D04.615.562.900.720 – rolitetracycline
  - MeSH D04.615.562.900.875 – tetracycline
  - MeSH D04.615.562.900.937 – tigecycline

==== MeSH D04.615.638 – naphthalenes ====
- MeSH D04.615.638.059 – acenaphthenes
- MeSH D04.615.638.090 – adapalene
  - MeSH D04.615.638.090.500 – adapalene, benzoyl peroxide drug combination
- MeSH D04.615.638.120 – bunaftine
- MeSH D04.615.638.162 – carbaryl
- MeSH D04.615.638.183 – cinacalcet
- MeSH D04.615.638.204 – dansyl compounds
- MeSH D04.615.638.400 – lovastatin
  - MeSH D04.615.638.400.900 – simvastatin
  - MeSH D04.615.638.400.900.500 – ezetimibe, simvastatin drug combination
- MeSH D04.615.638.472 – naphthaleneacetic acids
  - MeSH D04.615.638.472.450 – naproxen
- MeSH D04.615.638.555 – naphthalenesulfonates
  - MeSH D04.615.638.555.200 – amaranth dye
  - MeSH D04.615.638.555.220 – amido black
  - MeSH D04.615.638.555.282 – anilino naphthalenesulfonates
  - MeSH D04.615.638.555.300 – congo red
  - MeSH D04.615.638.555.400 – evans blue
  - MeSH D04.615.638.555.750 – suramin
  - MeSH D04.615.638.555.875 – trypan blue
- MeSH D04.615.638.596 – naphthalimides
- MeSH D04.615.638.638 – naphthols
- MeSH D04.615.638.721 – naphthoquinones
  - MeSH D04.615.638.721.186 – atovaquone
  - MeSH D04.615.638.721.374 – vitamin k
  - MeSH D04.615.638.721.374.689 – vitamin k 1
  - MeSH D04.615.638.721.374.844 – vitamin k 2
  - MeSH D04.615.638.721.374.922 – vitamin k 3
- MeSH D04.615.638.845 – 1-naphthylamine
  - MeSH D04.615.638.845.800 – sertraline
- MeSH D04.615.638.850 – 2-naphthylamine
- MeSH D04.615.638.870 – 1-naphthylisothiocyanate
- MeSH D04.615.638.900 – naphthylvinylpyridine
- MeSH D04.615.638.930 – pravastatin
- MeSH D04.615.638.945 – propranolol
- MeSH D04.615.638.953 – terbinafine
- MeSH D04.615.638.960 – tetrahydronaphthalenes
  - MeSH D04.615.638.960.400 – 8-hydroxy-2-(di-n-propylamino)tetralin
  - MeSH D04.615.638.960.423 – bexarotene
  - MeSH D04.615.638.960.446 – bunolol
  - MeSH D04.615.638.960.446.500 – levobunolol
  - MeSH D04.615.638.960.585 – mibefradil
  - MeSH D04.615.638.960.675 – podophyllotoxin
  - MeSH D04.615.638.960.675.250 – etoposide
  - MeSH D04.615.638.960.837 – tetralones
- MeSH D04.615.638.975 – tolnaftate

==== MeSH D04.615.680 – phenalenes ====
- MeSH D04.615.680.750 – perylene

==== MeSH D04.615.723 – phenanthrenes ====
- MeSH D04.615.723.040 – abietanes
- MeSH D04.615.723.089 – aristolochic acids
- MeSH D04.615.723.180 – chrysenes
- MeSH D04.615.723.795 – morphinans
  - MeSH D04.615.723.795.106 – benzomorphans
  - MeSH D04.615.723.795.106.700 – pentazocine
  - MeSH D04.615.723.795.106.715 – phenazocine
  - MeSH D04.615.723.795.150 – buprenorphine
  - MeSH D04.615.723.795.150.500 – buprenorphine, naloxone drug combination
  - MeSH D04.615.723.795.165 – butorphanol
  - MeSH D04.615.723.795.200 – dextromethorphan
  - MeSH D04.615.723.795.235 – dextrorphan
  - MeSH D04.615.723.795.250 – diprenorphine
  - MeSH D04.615.723.795.270 – etorphine
  - MeSH D04.615.723.795.413 – levallorphan
  - MeSH D04.615.723.795.463 – levorphanol
  - MeSH D04.615.723.795.576 – morphine derivatives
  - MeSH D04.615.723.795.576.149 – codeine
  - MeSH D04.615.723.795.576.149.287 – hydrocodone
  - MeSH D04.615.723.795.576.149.575 – oxycodone
  - MeSH D04.615.723.795.576.350 – dihydromorphine
  - MeSH D04.615.723.795.576.430 – ethylmorphine
  - MeSH D04.615.723.795.576.445 – heroin
  - MeSH D04.615.723.795.576.450 – hydromorphone
  - MeSH D04.615.723.795.576.571 – morphine
  - MeSH D04.615.723.795.576.692 – oxymorphone
  - MeSH D04.615.723.795.576.856 – thebaine
  - MeSH D04.615.723.795.606 – nalbuphine
  - MeSH D04.615.723.795.656 – nalorphine
  - MeSH D04.615.723.795.706 – naloxone
  - MeSH D04.615.723.795.706.275 – buprenorphine, naloxone drug combination
  - MeSH D04.615.723.795.706.550 – naltrexone

==== MeSH D04.615.799 – pyrenes ====
- MeSH D04.615.799.306 – benzopyrenes
  - MeSH D04.615.799.306.300 – benzo(a)pyrene
  - MeSH D04.615.799.306.400 – dihydroxydihydrobenzopyrenes
  - MeSH D04.615.799.306.400.350 – 7,8-dihydro-7,8-dihydroxybenzo(a)pyrene 9,10-oxide

=== MeSH D04.663 – polycyclic sesquiterpenes ===
==== MeSH D04.663.500 – sesquiterpenes, eudesmane ====
- MeSH D04.663.500.500 – santonin
- MeSH D04.663.500.750 – sesquiterpenes, guaiane
  - MeSH D04.663.500.750.888 – thapsigargin

=== MeSH D04.711 – spiro compounds ===
==== MeSH D04.711.347 – fluoresceins ====
- MeSH D04.711.347.300 – eosine i bluish
- MeSH D04.711.347.325 – eosine yellowish-(ys)
- MeSH D04.711.347.350 – erythrosine
- MeSH D04.711.347.390 – fluorescein
- MeSH D04.711.347.400 – fluorescein-5-isothiocyanate
- MeSH D04.711.347.550 – merbromin
- MeSH D04.711.347.700 – rose bengal

==== MeSH D04.711.900 – spirooxindoles ====
The list continues at List of MeSH codes (D05).
