= C26H45NO6S =

The molecular formula C_{26}H_{45}NO_{6}S (molar mass: 499.70 g/mol, exact mass: 499.2968 u) may refer to:

- Taurochenodeoxycholic acid
- Taurodeoxycholic acid
- Tauroursodeoxycholic acid (TUDCA)
