= SLCO1B3 =

Protein-coding gene in the species Homo sapiens

Identifiers
- Aliases: SLCO1B3, HBLRR, LST-2, LST-3TM13, LST3, OATP-8, OATP1B3, OATP8, SLC21A8, solute carrier organic anion transporter family member 1B3
- External IDs: OMIM: 605495; MGI: 1351899; GeneCards: SLCO1B3

Gene location (Human)
Chr.	Chromosome 12 (human)
Band	12p12.2	Start	20,810,702 bp
Band	12p12.2	End	20,916,911 bp

Gene location (Mouse)
Chr.	Chromosome 6 (mouse)
Band	6 G2|6 72.57 cM	Start	141,575,244 bp
Band	6 G2|6 72.57 cM	End	141,632,372 bp
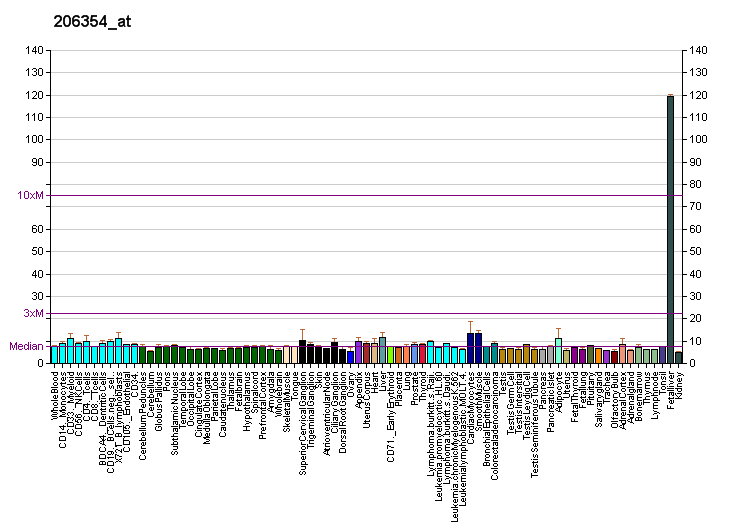
RNA expression pattern
Bgee	Human / Mouse (ortholog); Top expressed in: right lobe of liver; testicle; olfactory zone of nasal mucosa; Epithelium of choroid plexus; gonad; nasal epithelium; buccal mucosa cell; tibial nerve; canal of the cervix; gallbladder / Top expressed in: left lobe of liver; embryo; sexually immature organism; medial head of gastrocnemius muscle; primary visual cortex; proximal tubule; jejunum; thoracic diaphragm; pancreas; right kidney; More reference expression data
BioGPS	More reference expression data
Gene ontology
Molecular function	transporter activity; organic anion transmembrane transporter activity; bile acid transmembrane transporter activity; sodium-independent organic anion transmembrane transporter activity
Cellular component	integral component of membrane; basolateral plasma membrane; integral component of plasma membrane; membrane; plasma membrane
Biological process	ion transport; bile acid and bile salt transport; organic anion transport; sodium-independent organic anion transport; transmembrane transport
Sources:Amigo / QuickGO
Orthologs
Databases	NCBI: entry; OMA: entry
Species	Human	Mouse
Entrez	28234	28253
Ensembl	ENSG00000111700	ENSMUSG00000030236
UniProt	Q9NPD5	Q9JJL3
RefSeq (mRNA)	NM_019844; NM_001349920	NM_020495; NM_178235
RefSeq (protein)	NP_062818; NP_001336849	NP_065241
Location (UCSC)	Chr 12: 20.81 – 20.92 Mb	Chr 6: 141.58 – 141.63 Mb
PubMed search
- Wikidata
View/Edit Human	View/Edit Mouse

Solute carrier organic anion transporter family member 1B3 (SLCO1B3) also known as organic anion-transporting polypeptide 1B3 (OATP1B3) is a protein that in humans is encoded by the SLCO1B3 gene.

OATP1B3 is a 12-transmembrane domain influx transporter. Normally expressed in the liver, the transporter functions to uptake large, non-polar drugs and hormones from the portal vein.

== Clinical significance ==
OATP1B3 has also been identified as a transporter aberrantly expressed in prostate cancer and implicated in prostate cancer progression. Increasing mRNA expression of OATP1B3 was also correlated to prostate cancer Gleason score.

In addition, lower expression of OATP1B3 mRNA was also detected in testicular cancer.

== Substrates ==
Small molecules that are transported by SLCO1B3 include:

- Amanitin
- Atrasentan
- Bilirubin
- Bosentan
- BQ-123
- Bromsulphthalein (BSP)
- CDCA-NBD
- Cholate (CA)
- Cholecystokinin octapeptide (CCK-8)
- Dehydroepiandroserone-3-sulfate (DHEAS)
- Deltorphin II
- Demethylphalloin
- Digoxin
- Docetaxel
- [D-penicillamine2,5]enkephalin (DPDPE)
- Enalapril
- Estradiol-17β-glucuronide 5–25
- Estrone-3-sulfate
- Fexofenadine
- Fluvastatin
- Fluo-3
- Glutathione (GSH)
- Glycocholate (GCA)
- Glycoursodeoxycholate (GUDCA)
- Irinotecan
- Leukotriene C4 (LTC4)
- Methotrexate
- Microcystin
- Monoglyucuronosyl
- Olmesartan
- Ouabain
- Paclitaxel
- Phalloidin
- Pitavastatin
- Rifampicin
- Ro 48-5033 (Bosentan metabolite)
- Rosuvastatin
- SN-38
- Taurocholate (TCA)
- Taurochenodeoxycholate (TCDCA)
- Taurodeoxycholate (TDCA)
- Tauroursodeoxycholate (TUDCA)
- Telmisartan
- Thyroxine (T4)
- TR-14035
- Triiodothyronine (T3)
- Valsartan

== See also ==
- Solute carrier family
