= ENPP7 =

Protein-coding gene in the species Homo sapiens

Identifiers
- Aliases: ENPP7, ALK-SMase, E-NPP 7, NPP-7, NPP7, ectonucleotide pyrophosphatase/phosphodiesterase 7
- External IDs: OMIM: 616997; MGI: 3027917; HomoloGene: 110852; GeneCards: ENPP7; OMA:ENPP7 - orthologs

Gene location (Human)
Chr.	Chromosome 17 (human)
Band	17q25.3	Start	79,730,943 bp
Band	17q25.3	End	79,742,219 bp

Gene location (Mouse)
Chr.	Chromosome 11 (mouse)
Band	11|11 E2	Start	118,879,014 bp
Band	11|11 E2	End	118,884,047 bp
RNA expression pattern
Bgee	Human / Mouse (ortholog); Top expressed in: jejunal mucosa; duodenum; tendon of biceps brachii; testicle; vena cava; liver; Skeletal muscle tissue of rectus abdominis; right lobe of liver; trabecular bone; cerebellar vermis / Top expressed in: jejunum; placenta; ileum; yolk sac; blastocyst; duodenum; colon; stomach; More reference expression data
BioGPS	n/a
Gene ontology
Molecular function	catalytic activity; hydrolase activity; sphingomyelin phosphodiesterase activity; zinc ion binding; metal ion binding
Cellular component	integral component of membrane; microvillus; plasma membrane; Golgi apparatus; membrane; integral component of plasma membrane
Biological process	metabolism; sphingomyelin catabolic process; negative regulation of DNA replication; glycosphingolipid metabolic process; negative regulation of cell population proliferation; sphingomyelin metabolic process; lipid metabolism
Sources:Amigo / QuickGO
Orthologs
Species	Human	Mouse
Entrez	339221	238011
Ensembl	ENSG00000182156	ENSMUSG00000046697
UniProt	Q6UWV6	n/a
RefSeq (mRNA)	NM_178543	NM_001030291; NM_001359574
RefSeq (protein)	NP_848638	n/a
Location (UCSC)	Chr 17: 79.73 – 79.74 Mb	Chr 11: 118.88 – 118.88 Mb
PubMed search
- Wikidata
View/Edit Human	View/Edit Mouse

Ectonucleotide pyrophosphatase/phosphodiesterase family member 7 (E-NPP 7) also known as alkaline sphingomyelin phosphodiesterase (Alk-SMase) or intestinal alkaline sphingomyelinase is an enzyme that in humans is encoded by the ENPP7 gene.

== History ==
ENPP7 is a new name for an old enzyme whose activity was originally identified in 1969 by Nilsson as a type of sphingomyelinase that hydrolyses sphingomyelin to ceramide in the intestinal tract. The enzyme was then purified and characterized by Duan et al. and named alkaline sphingomyelinase (alk-SMase), as the optimal pH of the enzyme was 9.0 and its main substrate is sphingomyelin. Most previous studies used the name of alk-SMase for this protein. The name of ENPP7 was created based on the results of cloning studies which show that alk-SMase shares no structural similarities with either acid or neutral SMase but belongs to the family of ecto nucleotide pyrophosphatase/phosphodiesterase (ENPP). As a new addition to the family it is therefore called ENPP7 or NPP7. A 3D homology model of ENPP7 was recently constructed using the crystal structural of an NPP member in bacteria as a template.

== Tissue distribution ==
Differing from other ENPP members, ENPP7 seems only expressed in the intestinal mucosa in many species and additionally in human liver. In the intestinal tract, ENPP7 activity is low in the duodenum and colon but high in the middle of the jejunum. As an ecto enzyme, ENPP7 is located on the surface of the intestinal mucosa and is released in the lumen by bile salt and pancreatic trypsin. The enzyme expressed in human liver is released in the bile and delivered to the intestine.

The activity of ENPP7 depends specifically on two types of primary bile salts, taurocholate (TC) and taurochenodeoxycholate (TCDC) at critical micelle concentrations. Other detergents, such as CHAPS and Triton X-100 have no stimulatory effects rather inhibitory effects, indicating a biologic interaction between bile salts and the enzyme. Unlike acid and neutral SMases in the intestinal tract that are rapidly inactivated by pancreatic trypsin, alk-SMase is resistant to trypsin digestion. Thus ENPP7 is active in the intestinal lumen and is transported along the intestinal tract. Significant activity can be detected in the faeces.

The substrates of ENPP family vary greatly. Some have activity against nucleotides, some have activity against phospholipid and lysophospholipids. ENPP7 is the only enzyme that has a type of phospholipase C activity against sphingomyelin.

== Physiological functions and clinical implications ==
ENPP7 is the key enzyme in the gut that digests sphingomyelin. Sphingomyelin is a lipid constituent of cell membrane, and a dietary component being particularly abundant in milk, cheese, egg, and meat. Digestion of sphingomyelin mainly occurs in the middle part of the small intestine, where ENPP7 is abundant, indicating a role of the enzyme in sphingomyelin digestion. Recent studies on ENPP7 knockout mice clearly showed that digestion of sphingomyelin and generation of ceramide is severely affected in ENPP7 deficiency mice. ENPP7 is fully developed in the intestine before birth, which gives the infant ability to digest sphingomyelin in the milk.

The daily intake of sphingomyelin for human with Western diet is about 300 mg. Under physiological conditions, only part of the sphingomyelin can be digested and absorbed. The limitation is thought to be caused by several factors that are present in the intestine such as cholesterol, phospholipids, fat and high concentrations of bile salts. It is thus understandable why SM digestion occurs most effectively in the low part of the small intestine, where most fat, phospholipids, and bile salt have been absorbed or up taken. It is also understandable that considerable amount of dietary sphingomyelin is delivered into the colon and excreted in the feces.

ENPP7 may have important roles in preventing tumorigenesis in the intestinal tract, as ceramide, the product of sphingomyelin hydrolysis, can inhibit cell proliferation and stimulate cell differentiation and apoptosis. Animal studies showed that supplement of SM or ceramide in the diet may inhibit the development of colon cancer. Of particular interest is that the activity of ENPP7 is significantly decreased in human colorectal adenoma and carcinoma as well as in the feces of the cancer patients. The decrease is caused by expression of a few mutant forms of ENPP7, which lack exon 4, resulting in total inactivation of the enzyme, as found in human colon and liver cancer cells.

Besides sphingomyelin, ENPP7 can also degrade and inactivate platelet-activating factor (PAF), which is proinflammatory, indicating that ENPP7 may also have antiinflammatory effects. Rectal administration of recombinant ENPP7 has been shown to improve ulcerative colitis in an animal study, and patients with chronic ulcerative colitis are associated with a reduced ENPP7 activity.

ENPP7 may also affect cholesterol absorption. In the intestinal tract cholesterol and sphingomyelin are co-exiting in plasma membrane and in lipid vesicles, liposomes and micelles. The two molecules form a stable complex via van der Waals forces. Cholesterol absorption can be inhibited by supplementation of sphingomyelin in the diet. Milk sphingomyelin seems more potent than egg sphingomyelin, indicating that the inhibition is related to the degree of the saturation and the length of sphingomyelin. Recent studies further showed that formation of ceramide by ENPP7 in the gut enhanced sphingomyelin-induced inhibition of cholesterol, indicating regulatory roles of ENPP7 in cholesterol absorption.

== Regulation ==
The expression of ENPP7 can be modified by dietary factors. High fat diet (53% energy) greatly reduces ENPP7 activities and enzyme protein in the intestinal mucosa by 50%. On the other hand, water-soluble fiber psyllium was shown to increase both the activities and protein of ENPP7 in the colon of mice. Sphingomyelin can also increase the levels of ENPP7 after a long term of administration. Besides, ursodeoxycholic acid and probiotic VSL#3 may stimulate the expression of ENPP7 in the intestine.
