= C26H43NO5 =

The molecular formula C_{26}H_{43}NO_{5} (molar mass: 449.62 g/mol, exact mass: 449.3141 u) may refer to:

- Glycochenodeoxycholic acid
- Glycodeoxycholic acid
