= Salkowski's test =

Qualitative chemical test, primarily used for detecting cholesterol

Salkowski test
- Classification: Colorimetric method
- Analytes: Cholesterol, other sterols, indoles, terpenoids

Salkowski's test, also known simply as Salkowski test, is a qualitative chemical test, that is used in chemistry and biochemistry for detecting a presence of cholesterol and other sterols. This biochemical method got its name after German biochemist Ernst Leopold Salkowski, who is known for development of multiple new chemical tests, that are used for detection of different kinds of molecules (besides cholesterol and other sterols also for creatinine, carbon monoxide, glucose and indoles). A solution that has tested positive on the Salkowski's test becomes red and gets yellow glow.

== Basic information ==
=== Procedure ===
For Salkowski test's procedure one needs a sample, that is to be tested for sterols, as well as chloroform and concentrated sulfuric acid that represent Salkowski's reagent. Usually the solution of chloroform and the sample is prepared first and later treated with concentrated sulfuric (VI) acid. After that the whole solution needs to be shaken well. It is important to use only dried glassware, as dehydration reaction occurs during the test's procedure.

A solution that has tested positive on this qualitative chemical test exhibits two distinct layers in a test tube; the upper layer (chloroform) gets blueish red to violet colour, while the layer of sulfuric acid becomes yellow to green, with greenish glow being visible. If a sample does not contain any cholesterol or other sterols, colour of the tested solution remains unchanged and retains its original colour.

Salkowski test can also be used to test the presence of indoles (crystalline alkaloids that are a degradation products of proteins, containing tryptophan). In such cases a sample is treated with nitric acid and 2% solution of potassium nitrite, with positive reaction being shown by presence of red colour.

=== Chemistry of the test ===
Treating a solution of a sample, containing sterols, with chloroform and highly hygroscopic sulfuric acid, leads to a dehydration reaction (two water molecules are removed from two cholesterol molecules) and formation of new double bonds. During the chemical reaction two sterols bind together and bisterol (bisteroid) is formed; bi-cholestadien (double cholestene with two double bonds) in a case of cholesterol. Red colour of a solution is a consequence of bi-sulfonic acid of a bi-cholestadien, which is a product of sulfuric acid sulfonating bi-cholestadien.
