= CHAPS detergent =

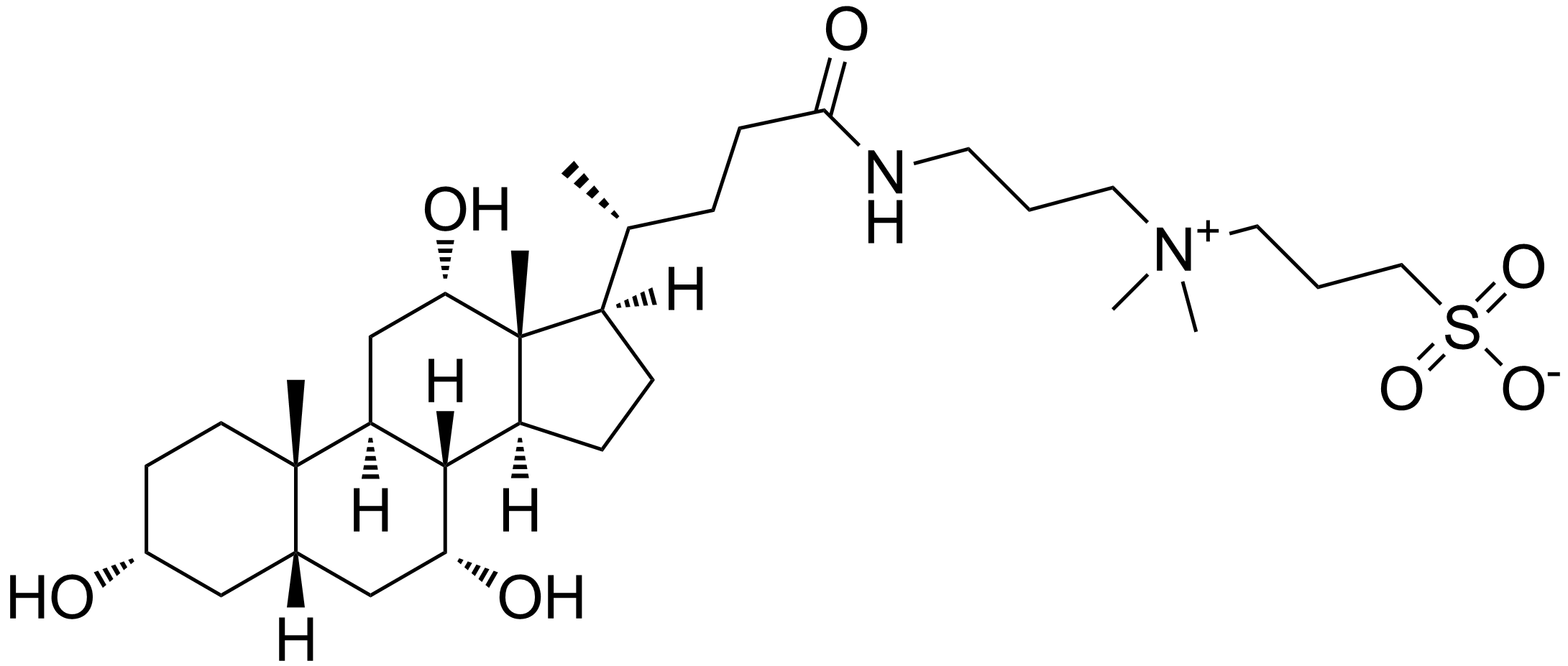
- Structural formula of CHAPS detergent

Names
- IUPAC name 3-{Dimethyl[3-(3α,7α,12α-trihydroxy-5β-cholan-24-amido)propyl]azaniumyl}propane-1-sulfonate
- Systematic IUPAC name 3-[Dimethyl(3-{(4R)-4-[(1'R,3aS,3bR,4R,5aS,7R,9aS,9bS,11S,11aR)-4,7,11-trihydroxy-9a,11a-dimethylhexadecahydro-1H-cyclopenta[a]phenanthren-1-yl]pentanamido}propyl)azaniumyl]propane-1-sulfonate
- Other names 3-[(3-Cholamidopropyl)dimethylammonio]-1-propanesulfonate

Identifiers
CAS Number	75621-03-3
3D model (JSmol)	Interactive image; Interactive image
Abbreviations	CHAPS
ChEMBL	ChEMBL450950
ChemSpider	96843
ECHA InfoCard	100.129.679
KEGG	C11321
MeSH	3-((3-Cholamidopropyl)dimethylammonium)-1-propanesulfonate
PubChem CID	107670; 24883538 (),(5R,7S, 16S); 10371606 (),(1S,5R,11S, 16S); 25244640 (4R),(2S,5R,7S, 15R,16S); 18397788 (4R),(2S,5R, 14R,15R,16S); 9895216 (4S), (2S,5R,14R,15S,16S)
UNII	QBP25342AG
CompTox Dashboard (EPA)	DTXSID70997059
- InChI: InChI=1S/C32H58N2O7S/c1-21(8-11-29(38)33-14-6-15-34(4,5)16-7-17-42(39,40)41)24-9-10-25-30-26(20-28(37)32(24,25)3)31(2)13-12-23(35)18-22(31)19-27(30)36/h21-28,30,35-37H,6-20H2,1-5H3,(H-,33,38,39,40,41) Key: UMCMPZBLKLEWAF-UHFFFAOYSA-N; InChI=1/C32H58N2O7S/c1-21(8-11-29(38)33-14-6-15-34(4,5)16-7-17-42(39,40)41)24-9-10-25-30-26(20-28(37)32(24,25)3)31(2)13-12-23(35)18-22(31)19-27(30)36/h21-28,30,35-37H,6-20H2,1-5H3,(H-,33,38,39,40,41)/t21-,22+,23-,24-,25+,26+,27-,28+,30+,31+,32-/m1/s1 Key: UMCMPZBLKLEWAF-BCTGSCMUBQ; InChI=1S/C32H58N2O7S/c1-21(8-11-29(38)33-14-6-15-34(4,5)16-7-17-42(39,40)41)24-9-10-25-30-26(20-28(37)32(24,25)3)31(2)13-12-23(35)18-22(31)19-27(30)36/h21-28,30,35-37H,6-20H2,1-5H3,(H-,33,38,39,40,41)/t21-,22+,23-,24-,25+,26+,27-,28+,30+,31+,32-/m1/s1 Key: UMCMPZBLKLEWAF-BCTGSCMUSA-N
- SMILES: CC(CCC(=O)NCCC[N+](C)(C)CCCS([O-])(=O)=O)C1CCC2C3C(O)CC4CC(O)CCC4(C)C3CC(O)C12C; [O-]S(=O)(=O)CCC[N+](C)(C)CCCNC(=O)CC[C@@H](C)[C@H]4CC[C@H]3[C@H]2[C@@H]([C@@]1([C@@H](C[C@H](O)CC1)C[C@H]2O)C)C[C@H](O)[C@@]34C

Properties
Chemical formula	C_{32}H_{58}N_{2}O_{7}S
Molar mass	614.88 g·mol^{−1}
- Surface tension
CMC	8-10 mM
log P	−4.32 (predicted)
- Except where otherwise noted, data are given for materials in their standard state (at 25 °C [77 °F], 100 kPa). verify (what is ?) Infobox references

CHAPS is a zwitterionic surfactant used in the laboratory to solubilize biological macromolecules such as proteins. It may be synthesized from cholic acid and is zwitterionic due to its quaternary ammonium and sulfonate groups; it is structurally similar to certain bile acids, such as taurodeoxycholic acid and taurochenodeoxycholic acid. It is used as a non-denaturing detergent in the process of protein purification and is especially useful in purifying membrane proteins, which are often sparingly soluble or insoluble in aqueous solution due to their native hydrophobicity.

CHAPS is an abbreviation for 3-[(3-cholamidopropyl)dimethylammonio]-1-propanesulfonate. A related detergent, called CHAPSO, has the same basic chemical structure with an additional hydroxyl functional group; its full chemical name is 3-[(3-cholamidopropyl)dimethylammonio]-2-hydroxy-1-propanesulfonate. Both detergents have low light absorbance in the ultraviolet region of the electromagnetic spectrum, which is useful for monitoring ongoing chemical reactions or protein-protein binding with UV/Vis spectroscopy.

== See also ==
- Taurodeoxycholic acid
- Taurochenodeoxycholic acid
