= Chenodeoxycholoyltaurine hydrolase =

Class of enzyme

Identifiers
- EC no.: 3.5.1.74
- CAS no.: 125752-75-2

Databases
- BRENDA: enzyme data
- ExPASy: NiceZyme view
- KEGG: enzyme entry
- MetaCyc: metabolic pathway
- Rhea: reactions
- PDB structures: RCSB PDB PDBe PDBsum
- Gene Ontology: AmiGO / QuickGO
Search
- PMC: articles
- PubMed: articles
- NCBI: proteins

Chenodeoxycholoyltaurine hydrolase (EC 3.5.1.74) is an enzyme characterised from Bacteroides vulgatus that catalyzes the hydrolysis of the bile acid, taurochenodeoxycholic acid to chenodeoxycholic acid and taurine:

taurochenodeoxycholic acid
H_{2}O
chenodeoxycholic acid
+
taurine

This enzyme is a hydrolase, one acting on carbon-nitrogen bonds other than peptide bonds, specifically in linear amides. The systematic name of this enzyme class is chenodeoxycholoyltaurine amidohydrolase.
