= Glycochenodeoxycholate sulfotransferase =

Class of enzymes

Identifiers
- EC no.: 2.8.2.34

Databases
- BRENDA: enzyme data
- ExPASy: NiceZyme view
- KEGG: enzyme entry
- MetaCyc: metabolic pathway
- Rhea: reactions
- PDB structures: RCSB PDB PDBe PDBsum
Search
- PMC: articles
- PubMed: articles
- NCBI: proteins

Glycochenodeoxycholate sulfotransferase (EC 2.8.2.34) is an enzyme that catalyzes the chemical reaction

glycochenodeoxycholic acid
+ PAPS
glycochenodeoxycholic acid 7-sulfate
+ adenosine 3',5'-
bisphosphate

The enzyme characterised from hamsters uses the cofactor 3'-phosphoadenosine-5'-phosphosulfate (PAPS) to convert the bile acid, glycochenodeoxycholic acid, to its sulfate derivative, giving adenosine 3',5'-bisphosphate as a byproduct.

== Nomenclature ==
This enzyme is a transferase, specifically a sulfotransferases, which transfer sulfur-containing groups. The systematic name of this enzyme class is 3'-phosphoadenylyl-sulfate:glycochenodeoxycholate 7-sulfotransferase. Other names in common use include bile acid:3'-phosphoadenosine-5'-phosphosulfate sulfotransferase, bile acid:PAPS:sulfotransferase, and BAST.

== See also ==
- Bile salt sulfotransferase which acts on a wider range of substrates in a similar reaction
