= Ernst Leopold Salkowski =

German biochemist

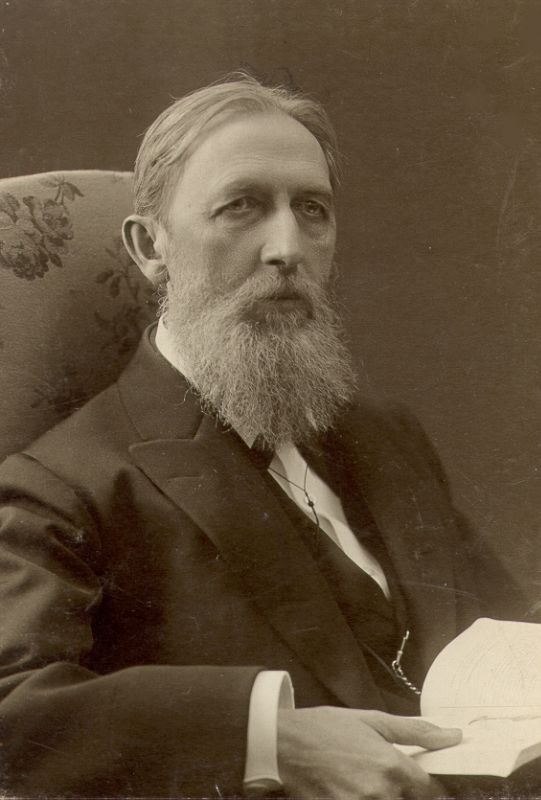
E. L. Salkowski.

Ernst Leopold Salkowski (October 11, 1844 – March 8, 1923) was a German biochemist who was a native of Königsberg.

He received his education at the University of Königsberg, later working in Berlin as an assistant in the chemical laboratory of Rudolf Virchow's institute of pathology (1872). In 1874 he became an associate professor of medicinal chemistry in Berlin, followed by an assignment as departmental head (1880). In 1909 he was honored with the title of "full professor".

Salkowski specialized in the fields of physiological and pathological chemistry, also making contributions in the related fields of pharmacology, analytical chemistry and hygiene. In 1890 he was the first to describe tissue autolysis, of which he referred to as "auto-digestion". He is remembered for developing tests for detection of various compounds and substances, such as cholesterol (Salkowski's test), creatinine, glucose, carbon monoxide, and indole. In 1892 (with Jastrowitz) he was the first to describe pentosuria.

He was the author of Practicum der physiologischen und pathologischen Chemie, later translated into English as "A Laboratory Manual of Physiological and Pathological Chemistry". With internist Wilhelm von Leube (1842-1922), he published Die Lehre vom Harn (The doctrine of urine).

== Selected writings ==
- Salkowski, Ernst Leopold (1904). A Laboratory Manual of Physiological and Pathological Chemistry. New York: John Wiley & Sons.
