= Taurolithocholic acid =

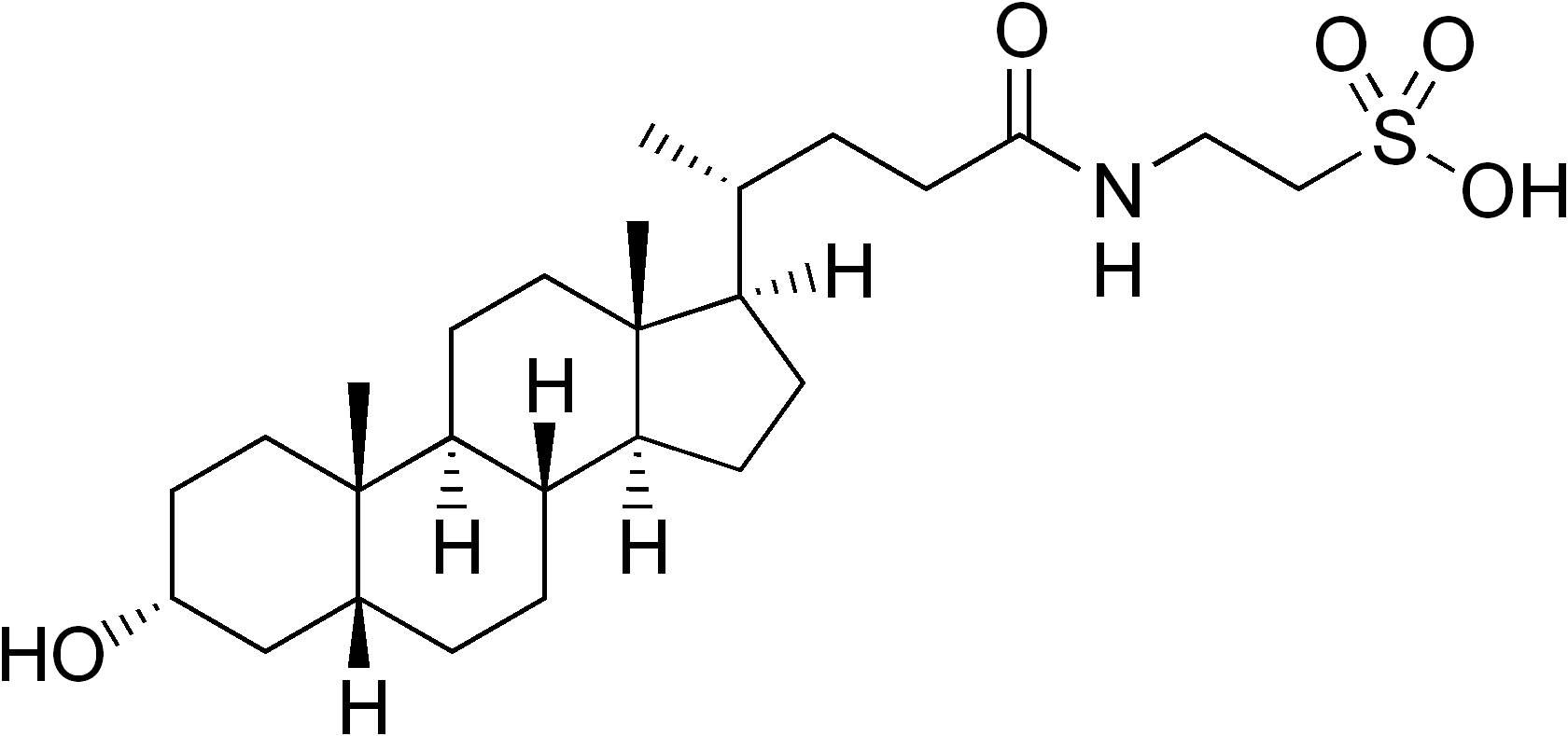

Names
- IUPAC name 2-(3α-Hydroxy-5β-cholan-24-amido)ethane-1-sulfonic acid
- Systematic IUPAC name 2-{(4R)-4-[(1R,3aS,3bR,5aR,7R,9aS,9bS,11aR)-7-Hydroxy-9a,11a-dimethylhexadecahydro-1H-cyclopenta[a]phenanthren-1-yl]pentanamido}ethane-1-sulfonic acid

Identifiers
CAS Number	516-90-5
3D model (JSmol)	Interactive image
ChEBI	CHEBI:36259
ChemSpider	388820
IUPHAR/BPS	4548
PubChem CID	439763
CompTox Dashboard (EPA)	DTXSID20965925
- InChI: InChI=1S/C26H45NO5S/c1-17(4-9-24(29)27-14-15-33(30,31)32)21-7-8-22-20-6-5-18-16-19(28)10-12-25(18,2)23(20)11-13-26(21,22)3/h17-23,28H,4-16H2,1-3H3,(H,27,29)(H,30,31,32)/t17-,18-,19-,20+,21-,22+,23+,25+,26-/m1/s1 Key: QBYUNVOYXHFVKC-GBURMNQMSA-N; InChI=1/C26H45NO5S/c1-17(4-9-24(29)27-14-15-33(30,31)32)21-7-8-22-20-6-5-18-16-19(28)10-12-25(18,2)23(20)11-13-26(21,22)3/h17-23,28H,4-16H2,1-3H3,(H,27,29)(H,30,31,32)/t17-,18-,19-,20+,21-,22+,23+,25+,26-/m1/s1 Key: QBYUNVOYXHFVKC-GBURMNQMBI
- SMILES: C[C@H](CCC(=O)NCCS(=O)(=O)O)[C@H]1CC[C@@H]2[C@@]1(CC[C@H]3[C@H]2CC[C@H]4[C@@]3(CC[C@H](C4)O)C)C

Properties
Chemical formula	C_{26}H_{45}NO_{5}S
Molar mass	483.70 g/mol
- Except where otherwise noted, data are given for materials in their standard state (at 25 °C [77 °F], 100 kPa). verify (what is ?) Infobox references

Taurolithocholic acid is a bile acid.

More than 50 types of secondary bile acids produced by microbes from the primary bile acids (cholic acid and chenodeoxycholic acid in humans) can be found in human feces. This includes the secondary bile acid taurolithocholic acid.

== See also ==
- Tauroursodeoxycholic acid
