= Metildigoxin =

Chemical compound

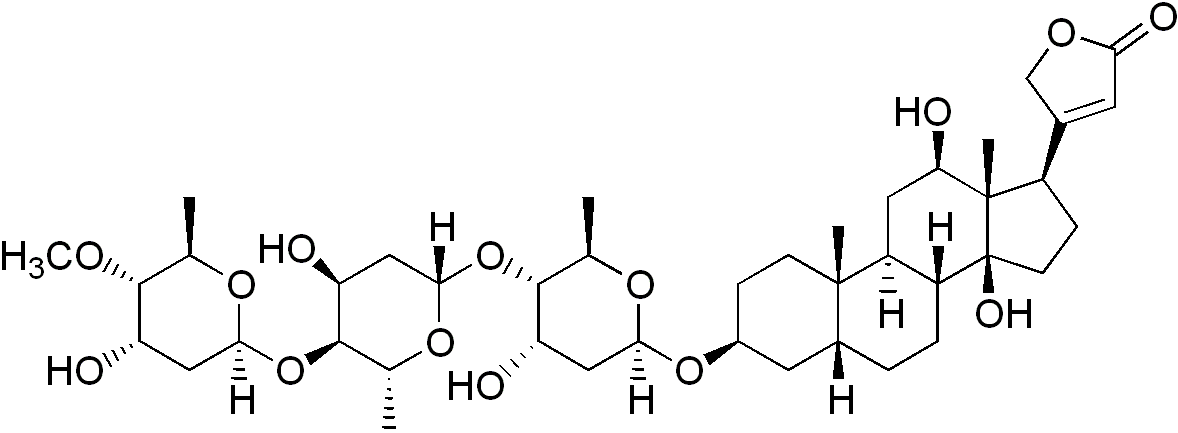

Clinical data
- Other names: 4-[(3S,5R,8R,9S,10S,12R,13S,14S)-12,14-Dihydroxy-3-[(2R,4S,5S,6R)-4-hydroxy-5-[(2S,4S,5S,6R)-4-hydroxy-5-[(2S,4S,5S,6R)-4-hydroxy-5-methoxy-6-methyl-oxan-2-yl]oxy-6-methyl-oxan-2-yl]oxy-6-methyl-oxan-2-yl]oxy-10,13-dimethyl-1,2,3,4,5,6,7,8,9,11,12,15,16,17-tetradecahydrocyclopenta[a]phenanthren-17-yl]-5H-furan-2-one
- AHFS/Drugs.com: International Drug Names
- Pregnancy category: C
- ATC code: C01AA08 (WHO)

Identifiers
- IUPAC name: (3β,5β,12β)-3-{[2,6-dideoxy-4-O-methyl-β-D-ribo-hexopyranosyl-(1→4)-2,6-dideoxy-β-D-ribo-hexopyranosyl-(1→4)-2,6-dideoxy-β-D-ribo-hexopyranosyl]oxy}-12,14-dihydroxycard-20(22)-enolide
- CAS Number: 30685-43-9
- PubChem CID: 443946
- ChemSpider: 392000
- UNII: I7GG1YUC5V
- CompTox Dashboard (EPA): DTXSID0023294
- ECHA InfoCard: 100.045.705

Chemical and physical data
- Formula: C_{42}H_{66}O_{14}
- Molar mass: 794.976 g·mol^{−1}
- 3D model (JSmol): Interactive image
- SMILES: O=C\1OC/C(=C/1)[C@H]2CC[C@@]8(O)[C@]2(C)[C@H](O)C[C@H]7[C@H]8CC[C@H]6[C@]7(C)CC[C@H](O[C@@H]5O[C@H](C)[C@@H](O[C@@H]4O[C@@H]([C@@H](O[C@@H]3O[C@@H]([C@@H](OC)[C@@H](O)C3)C)[C@@H](O)C4)C)[C@@H](O)C5)C6
- InChI: InChI=1S/C42H66O14/c1-20-37(49-6)29(43)16-35(51-20)55-39-22(3)53-36(18-31(39)45)56-38-21(2)52-34(17-30(38)44)54-25-9-11-40(4)24(14-25)7-8-27-28(40)15-32(46)41(5)26(10-12-42(27,41)48)23-13-33(47)50-19-23/h13,20-22,24-32,34-39,43-46,48H,7-12,14-19H2,1-6H3/t20-,21-,22-,24-,25+,26-,27-,28+,29+,30+,31+,32-,34+,35+,36+,37-,38-,39-,40+,41+,42+/m1/s1; Key:IYJMSDVSVHDVGT-PEQKVOOWSA-N

Metildigoxin (INN, or medigoxin BAN, or methyldigoxin) is a cardiac glycoside, a type of drug that can be used in the treatment of congestive heart failure and cardiac arrhythmia (irregular heartbeat). The substance is closely related to digoxin; it differs from the latter only by an O-methyl group on the terminal monosaccharide.
