= Dehydrocholic acid =

Names
- IUPAC name 3,7,12-Trioxo-5β-cholan-24-oic acid
- Systematic IUPAC name (4R)-[(1R,3aS,3bR,5aS,9aS,9bS,11aR)-9a,11a-Dimethyl-4,7,11-trioxohexadecahydro-1H-cyclopenta[a]phenanthren-1-yl]pentanoic acid

Identifiers
CAS Number	81-23-2
3D model (JSmol)	Interactive image
ChEMBL	ChEMBL514446
ChemSpider	6422
ECHA InfoCard	100.001.215
KEGG	D01693
PubChem CID	6674
UNII	NH5000009I
CompTox Dashboard (EPA)	DTXSID2022888
- InChI: InChI=1/C24H34O5/c1-13(4-7-21(28)29)16-5-6-17-22-18(12-20(27)24(16,17)3)23(2)9-8-15(25)10-14(23)11-19(22)26/h13-14,16-18,22H,4-12H2,1-3H3,(H,28,29)/t13-,14+,16-,17+,18+,22+,23+,24-/m1/s1 Key: OHXPGWPVLFPUSM-KLRNGDHRBE
- SMILES: O=C2C[C@H]3CC(=O)[C@H]1[C@H]4[C@](C(=O)C[C@@H]1[C@@]3(C)CC2)([C@H](CC4)[C@H](C)CCC(=O)O)C

Properties
Chemical formula	C_{24}H_{34}O_{5}
Molar mass	402.531 g·mol^{−1}
- Except where otherwise noted, data are given for materials in their standard state (at 25 °C [77 °F], 100 kPa). Infobox references

Dehydrocholic acid is a synthetic bile acid, manufactured by the oxidation of cholic acid. It acts as a hydrocholeretic, increasing bile output to clear increased bile acid load.
