= Dihydrotachysterol =

Chemical compound

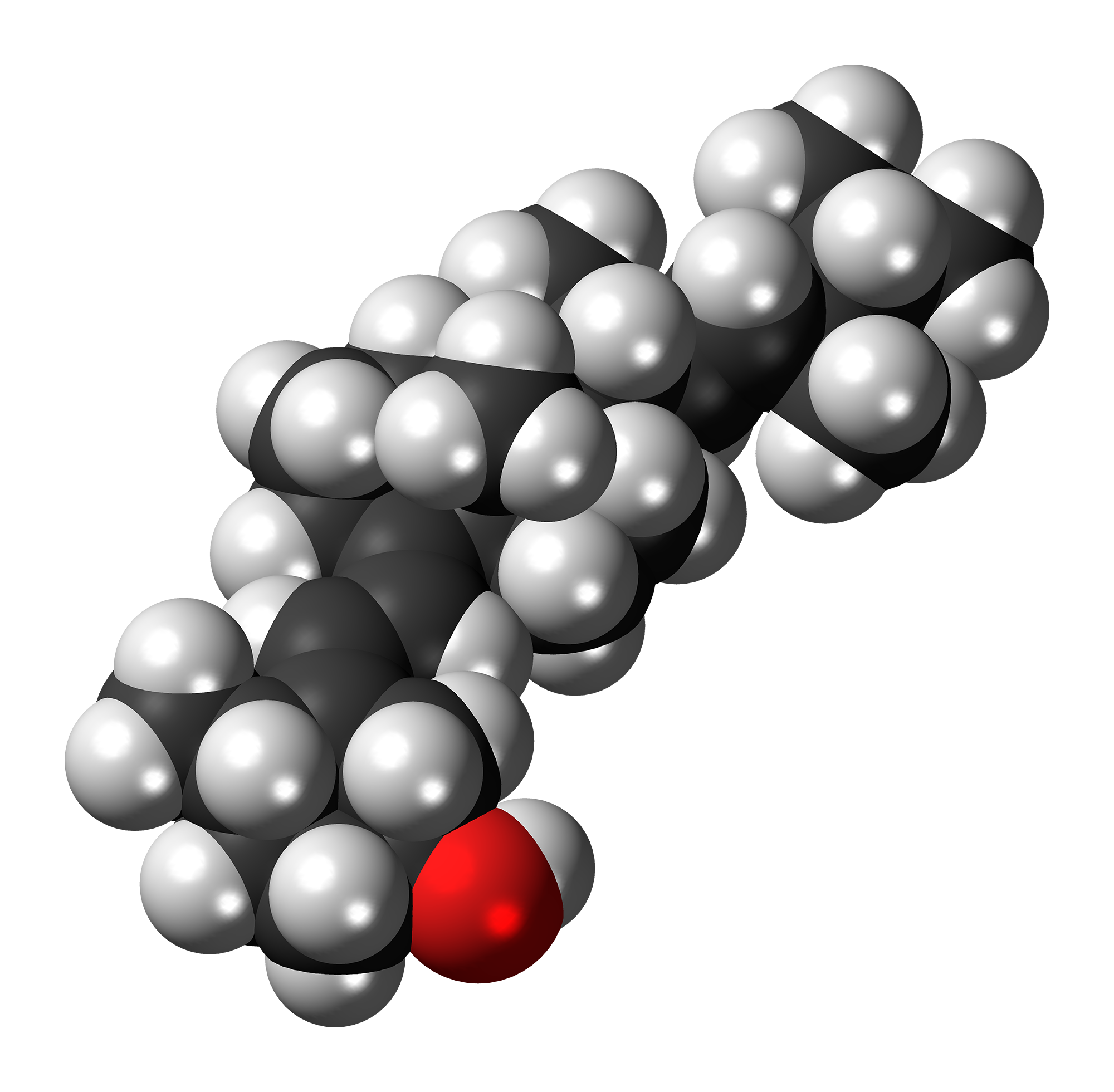

Clinical data
- AHFS/Drugs.com: Micromedex Detailed Consumer Information
- MedlinePlus: a682335
- ATC code: A11CC02 (WHO)

Identifiers
- IUPAC name: (1S,3E,4S)-3-[(2E)-2-[(1R,3aS,7aR)-1-[(E,2R,5R)-5,6-Dimethylhept-3-en-2-yl]-7a-methyl-2,3,3a,5,6,7-hexahydro-1H-inden-4-ylidene]ethylidene]-4-methylcyclohexan-1-ol
- CAS Number: 67-96-9
- PubChem CID: 5311071
- DrugBank: DB01070
- ChemSpider: 4470607
- UNII: R5LM3H112R
- KEGG: D00299
- ChEBI: CHEBI:4591
- CompTox Dashboard (EPA): DTXSID5022938
- ECHA InfoCard: 100.000.611

Chemical and physical data
- Formula: C_{28}H_{46}O
- Molar mass: 398.675 g·mol^{−1}
- 3D model (JSmol): Interactive image
- SMILES: O[C@@H]3C/C(=C\C=C1/CCC[C@]2([C@H]1CC[C@@H]2[C@@H](/C=C/[C@H](C)C(C)C)C)C)[C@@H](C)CC3
- InChI: InChI=1S/C28H46O/c1-19(2)20(3)9-10-22(5)26-15-16-27-23(8-7-17-28(26,27)6)12-13-24-18-25(29)14-11-21(24)4/h9-10,12-13,19-22,25-27,29H,7-8,11,14-18H2,1-6H3/b10-9+,23-12+,24-13+/t20-,21-,22+,25-,26+,27-,28+/m0/s1; Key:ILYCWAKSDCYMBB-OPCMSESCSA-N

Dihydrotachysterol (DHT) is a synthetic vitamin D analog activated in the liver that does not require renal hydroxylation like vitamin D_{2} (ergocalciferol) and vitamin D_{3} (cholecalciferol). DHT has a rapid onset of action (2 hours), a shorter half-life, and a greater effect on mineralization of bone salts than does vitamin D.

DHT is a derivative of tachysterol. Tachysterol is a reaction side product in the light-dependent natural production of vitamin Ds.

Series	Provitamin	Vitamin	25(OH)	1,25(OH)_{2}
D_{3}	7-Dehydrocholesterol^{§}	Cholecalciferol^{ƒ#}	Calcifediol	Calcitriol^{#}
D_{2}	Ergosterol^{§}	Ergocalciferol^{ƒ#}	Ercalcidiol^{§}	Ercalcitriol^{§}
