= Pregnenedione =

A pregnenedione (singular pregnanediol) is an unsaturated diketone derivative of a pregnane. Examples are budesonide and progesterone (pregn-4-ene-3,20-dione).
