= Mycobacillin =

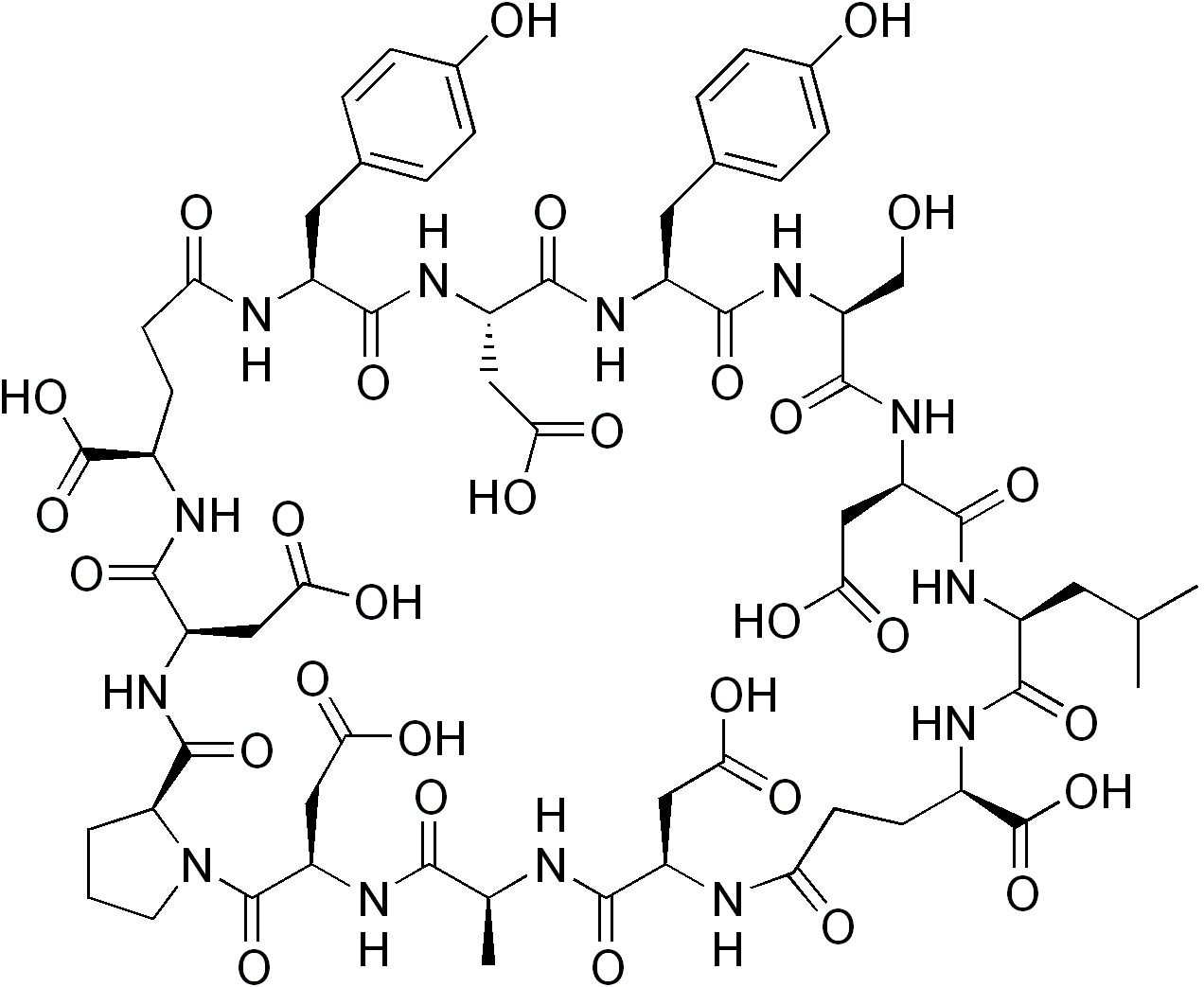

Names
- Other names Cyclo(L-alanyl-D-α-aspartyl-L-prolyl-D-α-aspartyl-D-γ-glutamyl-L-tyrosyl-L-α-aspartyl-L-tyrosyl-L-seryl-D-α-aspartyl-L-leucyl-D-γ-glutamyl-D-α-aspartyl)

Identifiers
CAS Number	18524-67-9
3D model (JSmol)	Interactive image
ChemSpider	17327464
PubChem CID	16199057
UNII	XY4W543XGK
- InChI: InChI=1S/C65H85N13O30/c1-28(2)19-36-55(96)69-34(64(105)106)15-17-47(83)68-39(22-48(84)85)54(95)66-29(3)53(94)76-43(26-52(92)93)63(104)78-18-4-5-45(78)62(103)75-42(25-51(90)91)58(99)70-35(65(107)108)14-16-46(82)67-37(20-30-6-10-32(80)11-7-30)56(97)73-40(23-49(86)87)60(101)72-38(21-31-8-12-33(81)13-9-31)57(98)77-44(27-79)61(102)74-41(24-50(88)89)59(100)71-36/h6-13,28-29,34-45,79-81H,4-5,14-27H2,1-3H3,(H,66,95)(H,67,82)(H,68,83)(H,69,96)(H,70,99)(H,71,100)(H,72,101)(H,73,97)(H,74,102)(H,75,103)(H,76,94)(H,77,98)(H,84,85)(H,86,87)(H,88,89)(H,90,91)(H,92,93)(H,105,106)(H,107,108)/t29-,34+,35+,36-,37-,38-,39+,40-,41+,42+,43+,44-,45-/m0/s1 Key: MGMBOQJARKXIAL-LCLLRQAKSA-N
- SMILES: N1[C@@H](C)C(=O)N[C@H](CC(O)=O)C(=O)N2[C@H](C(=O)N[C@H](CC(O)=O)C(=O)N[C@H](CCC(=O)N[C@@H](CC3=CC=C(C=C3)O)C(=O)N[C@@H](CC(O)=O)C(=O)N[C@@H](CC3=CC=C(C=C3)O)C(=O)N[C@@H](CO)C(=O)N[C@H](CC(O)=O)C(=O)N[C@@H](CC(C)C)C(=O)N[C@H](CCC(=O)N[C@H](CC(O)=O)C1=O)C(=O)O)C(=O)O)CCC2

Properties
Chemical formula	C_{65}H_{85}N_{13}O_{30}
Molar mass	1528.44 g/mol
Melting point	235 to 240 °C (455 to 464 °F; 508 to 513 K)
- Except where otherwise noted, data are given for materials in their standard state (at 25 °C [77 °F], 100 kPa). verify (what is ?) Infobox references

Mycobacillin is an antifungal cyclic peptide. It was first isolated in 1958 from the bacteria Bacillus subtilis.
