= Hydroxycholecalciferol =

Hydroxycholecalciferol may refer to:

- 1-Hydroxycholecalciferol (Alfacalcidol)
- 25-Hydroxycholecalciferol (Calcifediol or calcidiol)

== See also ==
- 1,25-Dihydroxycholecalciferol
