= Trichodermin =

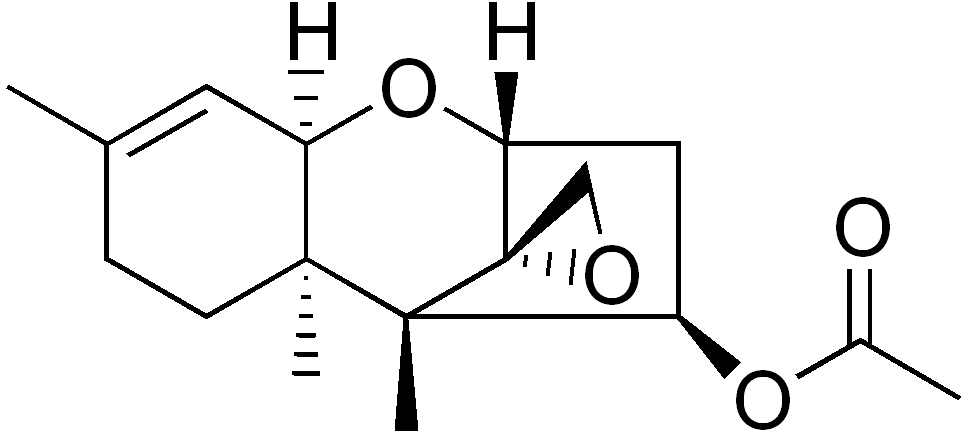

Names
- IUPAC name 12,13-Epoxytrichothec-9-en-4β-yl acetate
- Systematic IUPAC name (2R,2′S,4R,5S,5aR,9aR)-5,5a,8-Trimethyl-2,3,4,5,5a,6,7,9a-octahydrospiro[[2,5]methano[1]benzoxepine-10,2′-oxiran]-4-yl acetate

Identifiers
CAS Number	4682-50-2
3D model (JSmol)	Interactive image
Beilstein Reference	6868411
ChEBI	CHEBI:9688
ChEMBL	ChEMBL4463552
ChemSpider	19582
KEGG	C09741
PubChem CID	20806
UNII	WF22557W91
CompTox Dashboard (EPA)	DTXSID701017605
- InChI: InChI=1S/C17H24O4/c1-10-5-6-15(3)12(7-10)21-14-8-13(20-11(2)18)16(15,4)17(14)9-19-17/h7,12-14H,5-6,8-9H2,1-4H3/t12-,13-,14-,15+,16-,17+/m1/s1 Key: HNEGCRMUYSKRRR-IKIFYQGPSA-N
- SMILES: CC1=C[C@@H]2[C@](CC1)([C@]3([C@@H](C[C@H]([C@@]34CO4)O2)OC(=O)C)C)C

Properties
Chemical formula	C_{17}H_{24}O_{4}
Molar mass	292.37 g/mol
- Except where otherwise noted, data are given for materials in their standard state (at 25 °C [77 °F], 100 kPa). verify (what is ?) Infobox references

Trichodermin is a trichothecene. It inhibits protein formation in eukaryotes.
