= Dexamethasone isonicotinate =

Chemical compound

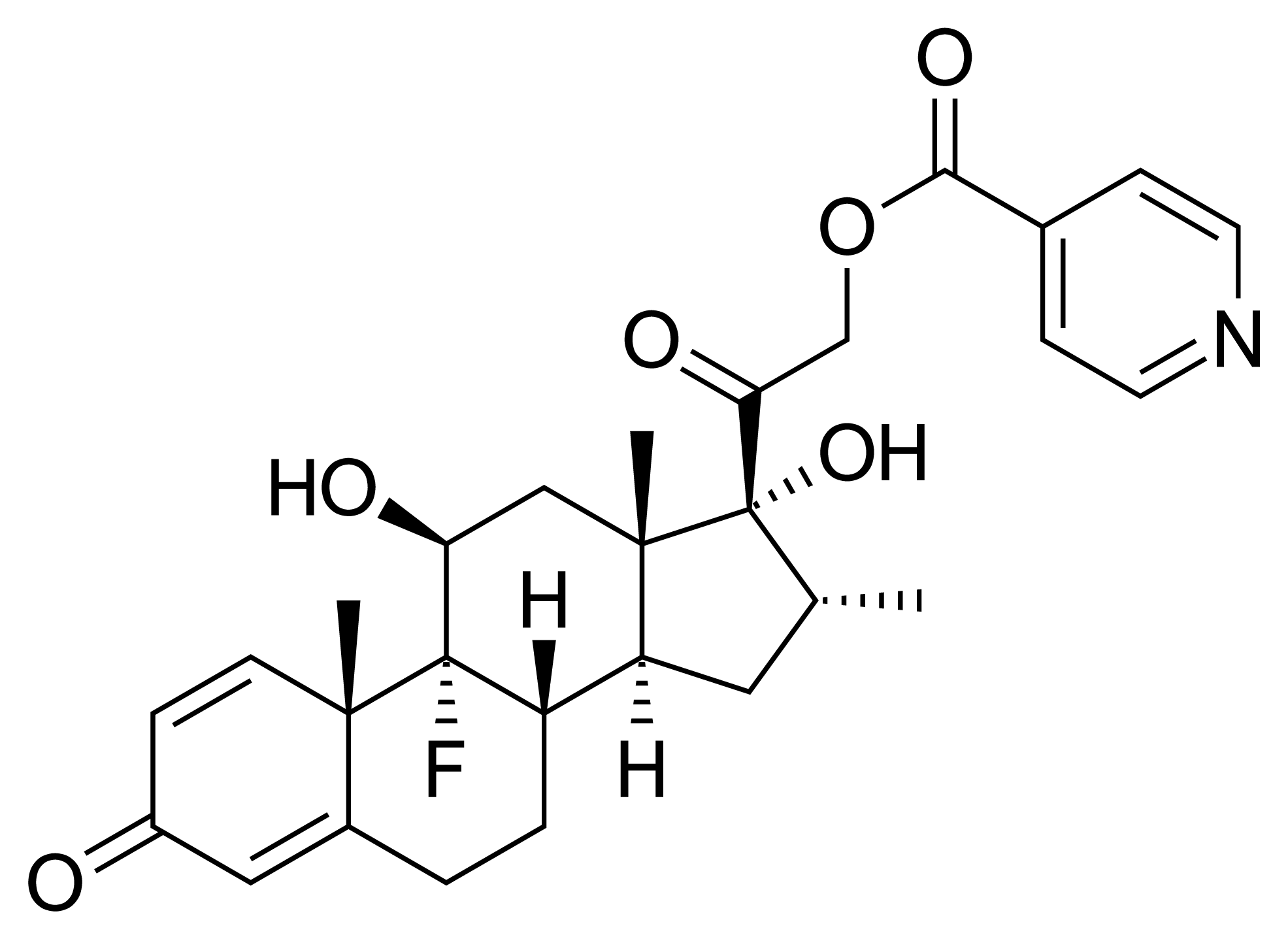
- Skeletal formula of dexamethasone isonicotinate

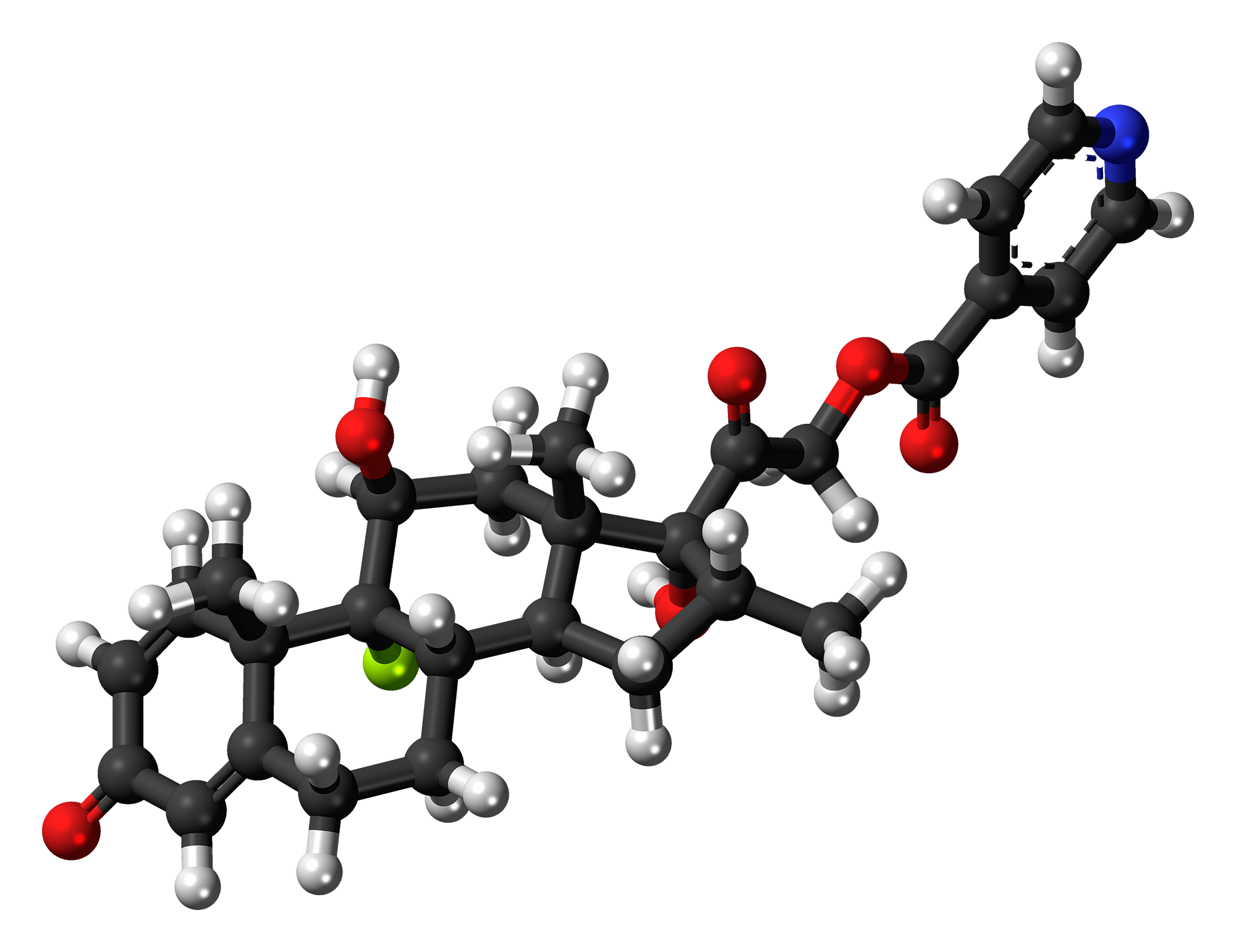
- Ball-and-stick model of the dexamethasone isonicotinate molecule

Clinical data
- Trade names: Auxiloson, Auxilson, Auxilsone, Voren
- Other names: Dexamethasone 21-isonicotinate; Dexamethasone 21-(4-Pyridinecarboxylate); HE-111; 9α-Fluoro-11β,17α-dihydroxy-16α-methyl-3,20-dioxopregna-1,4-dien-21-yl isonicotinate; 9α-Fluoro-11β,17α,21-trihydroxy-16α-methylpregna-1,4-diene-3,20-dione 21-(4-pyridinecarboxylate)

Identifiers
- IUPAC name: 2-[(1R,2R,3aS,3bS,9aS,9bR,10S,11aS)-9b-fluoro-1,10-dihydroxy-2,9a,11a-trimethyl-7-oxo-2,3,3a,3b,4,5,7,9a,9b,10,11,11a-dodecahydro-1H-cyclopenta[a]phenanthren-1-yl]-2-oxoethyl pyridine-4-carboxylate
- CAS Number: 2265-64-7
- PubChem CID: 16752
- DrugBank: DB11487
- ChemSpider: 15881
- UNII: 8LGC0BOA71
- KEGG: D07797
- ChEBI: CHEBI:177639
- ChEMBL: ChEMBL3186453
- CompTox Dashboard (EPA): DTXSID3057690
- ECHA InfoCard: 100.017.152

Chemical and physical data
- Formula: C_{28}H_{32}FNO_{6}
- Molar mass: 497.563 g·mol^{−1}
- 3D model (JSmol): Interactive image
- SMILES: C[C@@H]1C[C@H]2[C@@H]3CCC4=CC(=O)C=C[C@@]4([C@]3([C@H](C[C@@]2([C@]1(C(=O)COC(=O)C5=CC=NC=C5)O)C)O)F)C
- InChI: InChI=1S/C28H32FNO6/c1-16-12-21-20-5-4-18-13-19(31)6-9-25(18,2)27(20,29)22(32)14-26(21,3)28(16,35)23(33)15-36-24(34)17-7-10-30-11-8-17/h6-11,13,16,20-22,32,35H,4-5,12,14-15H2,1-3H3/t16-,20+,21+,22+,25+,26+,27+,28+/m1/s1; Key:BQTXJHAJMDGOFI-NJLPOHDGSA-N

Dexamethasone isonicotinate is an anti-inflammatory, anti-allergic glucocorticoid that can be administered orally, by inhalation, locally, and parenterally. It may cause salt and water retention.
