= Leucogenenol =

Names
- Other names Leukogenenol

Identifiers
CAS Number	29101-95-9
3D model (JSmol)	(proposed structure): Interactive image
ChemSpider	(proposed structure): 266077
PubChem CID	(proposed structure): 301101
CompTox Dashboard (EPA)	DTXSID90951698
- InChI: (proposed structure): InChI=1S/C18H25NO8/c1-9-3-13(23)18(16(25,5-9)8-20)19-7-12(22)15(27-18)17(26)6-11(21)4-10(2)14(17)24/h7,9-10,14,20,22,24-26H,3-6,8H2,1-2H3 Key: RIYYKCVJWUOAQK-UHFFFAOYSA-N
- SMILES: (proposed structure): CC1CC(=O)C2(C(C1)(CO)O)N=CC(=C(O2)C3(CC(=O)CC(C3O)C)O)O
- Except where otherwise noted, data are given for materials in their standard state (at 25 °C [77 °F], 100 kPa). verify (what is ?) Infobox references

Leucogenenol is a blood cell stimulating secondary metabolite isolated from the mold Penicillium gilmanii. The structure of this chemical was reported in 1971; however, later studies determined that the original structure is incorrect and the true chemical structure remains unknown.
