= Dihydroxycholecalciferol =

Dihydroxycholecalciferol may refer to:

- 1,25-Dihydroxycholecalciferol
- 24,25-Dihydroxycholecalciferol
