= Fluprednisolone =

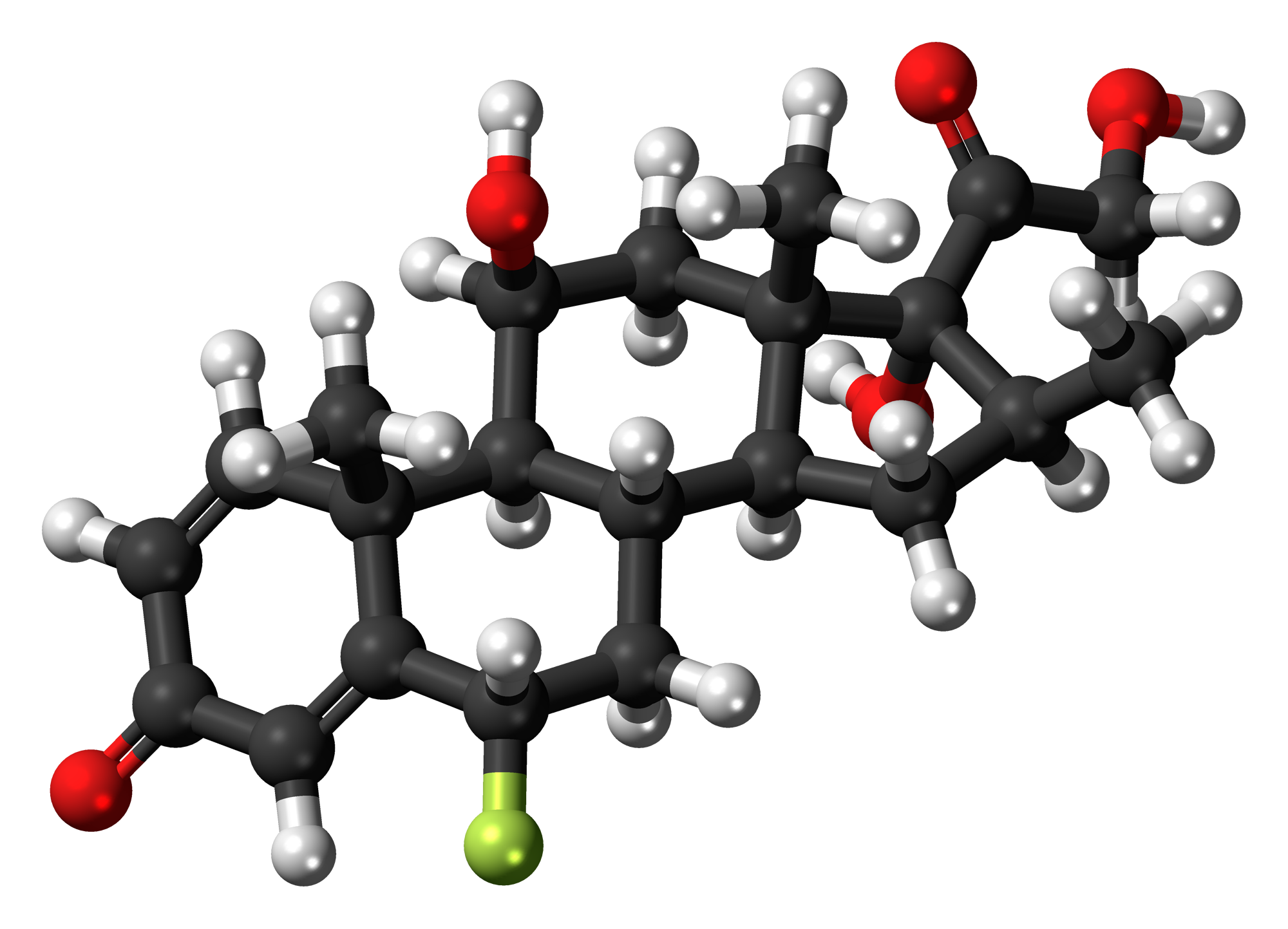

Names
- IUPAC name 6α-Fluoro-11β,17α,21-trihydroxypregna-1,4-diene-3,20-dione
- Systematic IUPAC name (1R,3aS,3bS,5S,9aR,9bS,10S,11aS)-5-Fluoro-1,10-dihydroxy-1-(hydroxyacetyl)-9a,11a-dimethyl-1,2,3,3a,3b,4,5,9a,9b,10,11,11a-dodecahydro-7H-cyclopenta[a]phenanthren-7-one

Identifiers
CAS Number	53-34-9
3D model (JSmol)	Interactive image
ChEMBL	ChEMBL1200774
ChemSpider	5665
ECHA InfoCard	100.000.156
KEGG	D04227
PubChem CID	5876
UNII	9H05937G3X
CompTox Dashboard (EPA)	DTXSID5046067
- InChI: InChI=1S/C21H27FO5/c1-19-5-3-11(24)7-14(19)15(22)8-12-13-4-6-21(27,17(26)10-23)20(13,2)9-16(25)18(12)19/h3,5,7,12-13,15-16,18,23,25,27H,4,6,8-10H2,1-2H3/t12-,13-,15-,16-,18+,19-,20-,21-/m0/s1 Key: MYYIMZRZXIQBGI-HVIRSNARSA-N; InChI=1/C21H27FO5/c1-19-5-3-11(24)7-14(19)15(22)8-12-13-4-6-21(27,17(26)10-23)20(13,2)9-16(25)18(12)19/h3,5,7,12-13,15-16,18,23,25,27H,4,6,8-10H2,1-2H3/t12-,13-,15-,16-,18+,19-,20-,21-/m0/s1 Key: MYYIMZRZXIQBGI-HVIRSNARBK
- SMILES: C[C@]12C[C@@H]([C@H]3[C@H]([C@@H]1CC[C@@]2(C(=O)CO)O)C[C@@H](C4=CC(=O)C=C[C@]34C)F)O

Properties
Chemical formula	C_{21}H_{27}FO_{5}
Molar mass	378.43 g/mol
- Except where otherwise noted, data are given for materials in their standard state (at 25 °C [77 °F], 100 kPa). verify (what is ?) Infobox references

Fluprednisolone is a pregnane. It is a corticosteroid.
