= Cholestene =

Names
- IUPAC name (8R,9S,10S,13R,14S,17R)-10,13-dimethyl-17-[(2R)-6-methylhept-6-en-2-yl]-2,3,4,5,6,7,8,9,11,12,14,15,16,17-tetradecahydro-1H-cyclopenta[a]phenanthrene

Identifiers
3D model (JSmol)	Interactive image
ChemSpider	29337801
PubChem CID	54545367
- InChI: InChI=1S/C27H46/c1-19(2)9-8-10-20(3)23-14-15-24-22-13-12-21-11-6-7-17-26(21,4)25(22)16-18-27(23,24)5/h20-25H,1,6-18H2,2-5H3/t20-,21?,22+,23-,24+,25+,26+,27-/m1/s1 Key: ZGDVRBVTNMQMEX-LDHZKLTISA-N
- SMILES: CC(CCCC(=C)C)C1CCC2C1(CCC3C2CCC4C3(CCCC4)C)C

Properties
Chemical formula	C_{27}H_{46}
Molar mass	370.665 g·mol^{−1}
- Except where otherwise noted, data are given for materials in their standard state (at 25 °C [77 °F], 100 kPa). Infobox references

Cholestenes are chiral molecules that are derivatives of cholestanes that have a double bond. If there are two double bonds, the molecule is known as a "cholestadiene". Examples include fusidic acid, lanosterol, and stigmasterol. Cholestene is a widely available chemical, used and sold commercially with red yeast rice. There are also derivatives of the molecule, such as 5-cholestene and 2-cholestene. These molecules differ by the placement of a double bond in one of its cyclohexane rings.

Computed Properties
Hydrogen Bond Donor Count	0
Defined Atom Stereocenter Count	7
Undefined Atom Stereocenter Count	1
Rotatable Bond Count	5

== Preparation ==
Cholestene has been synthetically prepared to mimic cholesterol, as they are used as important molecules to help important tools in the field of bioorganic and medicinal chemistry. Examples include facilitating siRNA transportation, enhancing DNA transfection, and potentially targeting tumors. In particular, researchers are interested in 3β-amino-5-cholestene, as it has a high affinity for phospholipid membranes.

3β-amino-5-cholestene, as well as other 3β-Derivatives, can be optimally synthesized from Cholesterol. The reaction scheme of 3β-amino-5-cholestene is shown below and adapted from Sun et al:

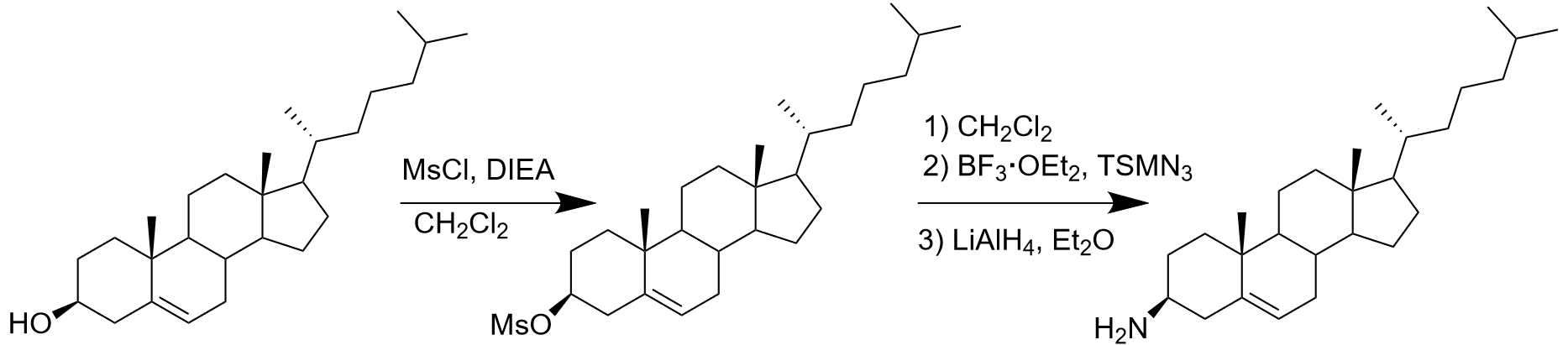

Figure 1: Multi-step Synthesis of 3β-amino-5-cholestene.

== Applications ==
Cholestene has been used as a dietary supplement and is often sold with red yeast rice to promote cholesterol management. These products may contain a naturally occurring statin (identical to lovastatin), which can cause serious drug interactions if not accounted for. Individuals with liver dysfunction or taking medication that weakens liver metabolism are at greater risk for these side effects, which may appear as muscle weakness, pain, fatigue and dark coloured urine.

In biological research, 3β-amino-5-cholestene (also referred to as aminocholesterol), a 3β-derivative of cholestene, has been shown to selectively enhance the magnetic susceptibility of lanthanide-chelating bicelles. When an aminocholesterol conjugate is used with different lanthanide ions, it can possibly fine tune a bicelle's magnetic susceptibility.

== Derivatives ==
=== 2-Cholestene ===
2D Structure of 2-cholestene

Chemical and Physical Properties
Synonyms	Cholest-2-ene
Molecular Formula	C27H46
Molecular Weight (g/mol)	370.7
Hydrogen Bond Donor Count	0
Defined Atom Stereocenter Count	7
Undefined Atom Stereocenter Count	1
Rotatable Bond Count	5

=== 5-Cholestene ===
2D Structure of 5-cholestene

Chemical and Physical Properties
Synonyms	Cholest-2-ene (5.alpha.)-5a-cholest-2-ene 5alpha-cholest-2-ene
Molecular Formula	C27H46
Molecular Weight (g/mol)	370.7
Hydrogen Bond Donor Count	0
Defined Atom Stereocenter Count	7
Undefined Atom Stereocenter Count	1
Rotatable Bond Count	5

== See also ==
- Red Yeast Rice
- Cholesterol
- Cholestane
- Fusidic Acid
- Lanosterol
- Stigmasterol
