= Glycodeoxycholic acid =

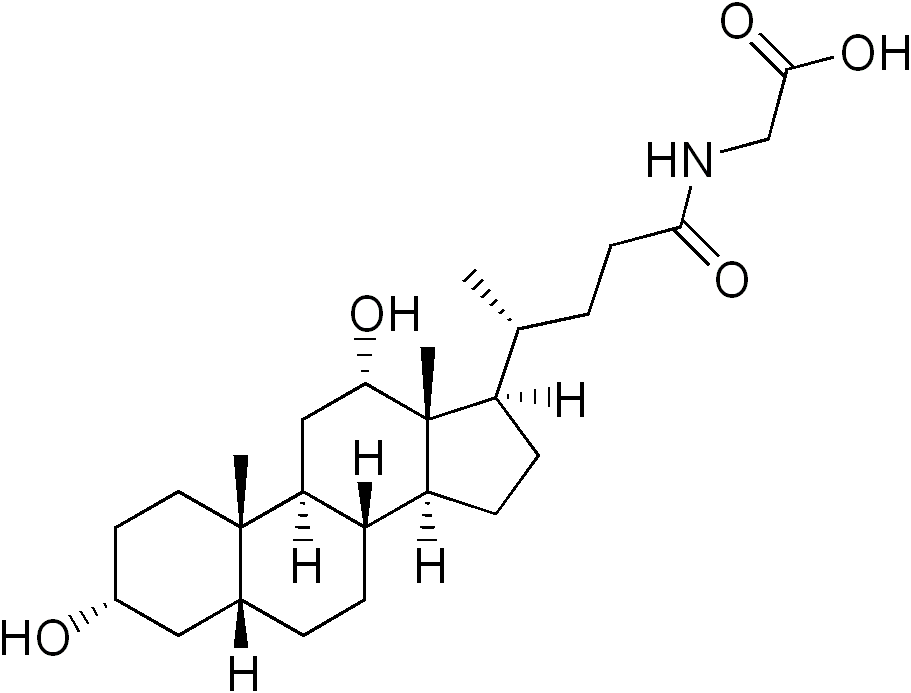

Names
- IUPAC name N-(3α,12α-Dihydroxy-5β-cholan-24-oyl)glycine
- Systematic IUPAC name {(4R)-4-[(1R,3aS,3bR,5aR,7R,9aS,9bS,11S,11aR)-7,11-Dihydroxy-9a,11a-dimethylhexadecahydro-1H-cyclopenta[a]phenanthren-1-yl]pentanamido}acetic acid

Identifiers
CAS Number	360-65-6
3D model (JSmol)	Interactive image
ChEBI	CHEBI:27471
ChemSpider	2299354
ECHA InfoCard	100.152.440
IUPHAR/BPS	4714
KEGG	C05464
MeSH	D006002
PubChem CID	3035026
UNII	DS124M0828
CompTox Dashboard (EPA)	DTXSID80957422
- InChI: InChI=1S/C26H43NO5/c1-15(4-9-23(30)27-14-24(31)32)19-7-8-20-18-6-5-16-12-17(28)10-11-25(16,2)21(18)13-22(29)26(19,20)3/h15-22,28-29H,4-14H2,1-3H3,(H,27,30)(H,31,32)/t15-,16-,17-,18+,19-,20+,21+,22+,25+,26-/m1/s1 Key: WVULKSPCQVQLCU-BUXLTGKBSA-N; InChI=1/C26H43NO5/c1-15(4-9-23(30)27-14-24(31)32)19-7-8-20-18-6-5-16-12-17(28)10-11-25(16,2)21(18)13-22(29)26(19,20)3/h15-22,28-29H,4-14H2,1-3H3,(H,27,30)(H,31,32)/t15-,16-,17-,18+,19-,20+,21+,22+,25+,26-/m1/s1 Key: WVULKSPCQVQLCU-BUXLTGKBBM
- SMILES: C[C@H](CCC(=O)NCC(=O)O)[C@H]1CC[C@@H]2[C@@]1([C@H](C[C@H]3[C@H]2CC[C@H]4[C@@]3(CC[C@H](C4)O)C)O)C

Properties
Chemical formula	C_{26}H_{43}NO_{5}
Molar mass	449.632 g·mol^{−1}
- Except where otherwise noted, data are given for materials in their standard state (at 25 °C [77 °F], 100 kPa). verify (what is ?) Infobox references

Glycodeoxycholic acid is a bile acid derived from deoxycholic acid and glycine. Except where otherwise noted, data are given for materials in their standard state (at 25 °C [77 °F], 100 kPa).

Serum concentration of glycodeoxycholic acid, a downstream microbial metabolite of cholic acid, is strongly associated with an increased risk of proximal colorectal cancer among women.
