= Glycochenodeoxycholic acid =

Names
- IUPAC name N-(3α,7α-Dihydroxy-5β-cholan-24-oyl)glycine
- Systematic IUPAC name {(4R)-4-[(1R,3aS,3bR,4R,5aS,7R,9aS,9bS,11aR)-4,7-Dihydroxy-9a,11a-dimethylhexadecahydro-1H-cyclopenta[a]phenanthren-1-yl]pentanamido}acetic acid

Identifiers
CAS Number	640-79-9
3D model (JSmol)	Interactive image
ChemSpider	12027
IUPHAR/BPS	4545
PubChem CID	12544
UNII	451ZNJ667Y
CompTox Dashboard (EPA)	DTXSID301020165
- InChI: InChI=1S/C26H43NO5/c1-15(4-7-22(30)27-14-23(31)32)18-5-6-19-24-20(9-11-26(18,19)3)25(2)10-8-17(28)12-16(25)13-21(24)29/h15-21,24,28-29H,4-14H2,1-3H3,(H,27,30)(H,31,32)/t15-,16+,17-,18-,19+,20+,21-,24+,25+,26-/m1/s1 Key: GHCZAUBVMUEKKP-GYPHWSFCSA-N
- SMILES: C[C@H](CCC(=O)NCC(=O)O)[C@H]1CC[C@@H]2[C@@]1(CC[C@H]3[C@H]2[C@@H](C[C@H]4[C@@]3(CC[C@H](C4)O)C)O)C

Properties
Chemical formula	C_{26}H_{43}NO_{5}
Molar mass	449.62 g/mol
- Except where otherwise noted, data are given for materials in their standard state (at 25 °C [77 °F], 100 kPa). verify (what is ?) Infobox references

Glycochenodeoxycholic acid, also abbreviated as GCDCA, is a bile salt formed in the liver from chenodeoxycholic acid and glycine, usually found as the sodium salt. It acts as a detergent to solubilize fats for absorption.

Positive associations were observed between prediagnostic plasma levels of seven different conjugated bile acid metabolites, including glycochenodeoxycholic acid, and colon cancer risk. These findings support experimental data suggesting that a high bile acid load promotes colon cancer.
