= Taurodeoxycholic acid =

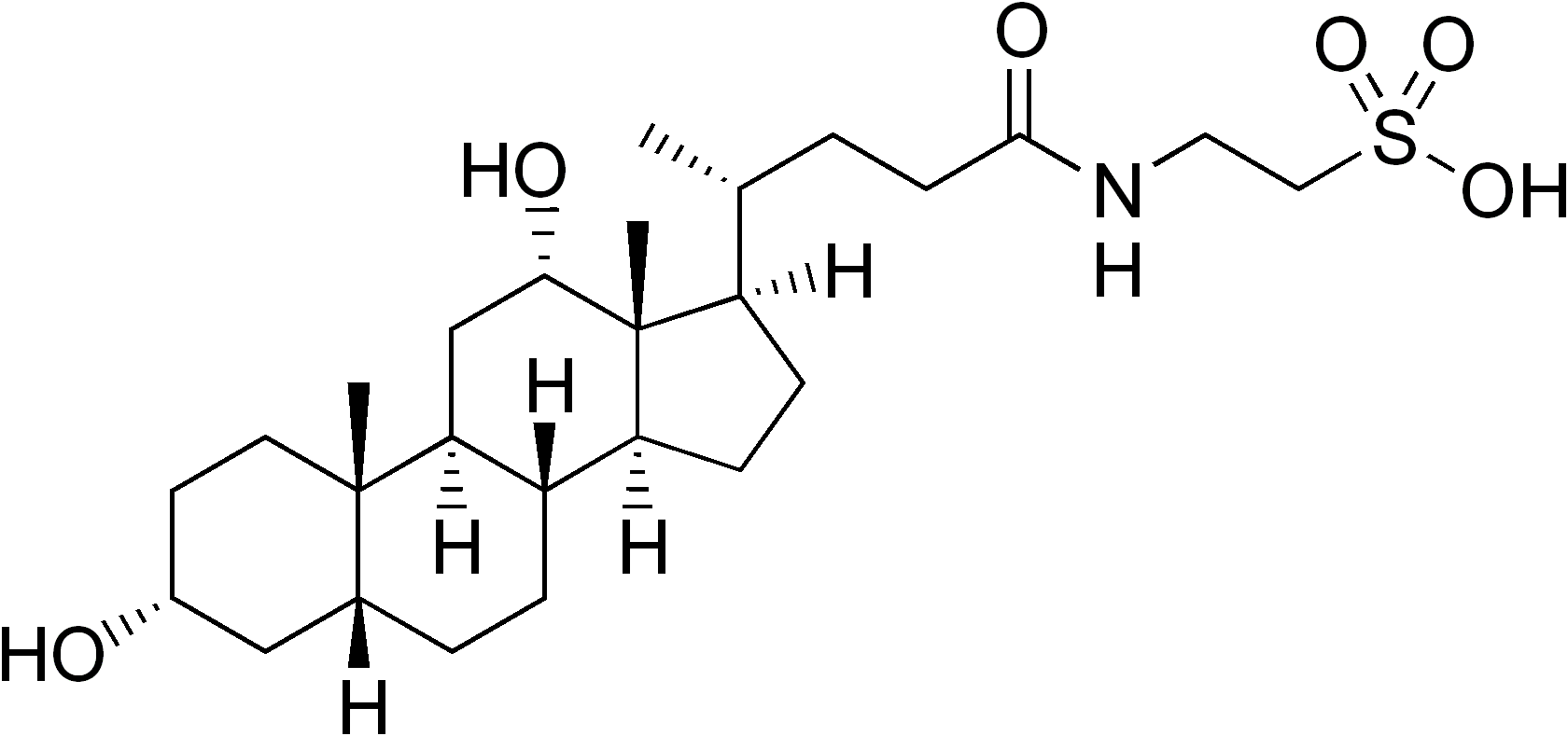

Names
- IUPAC name 2-(3α,12α-Dihydroxy-5β-cholan-24-amido)ethane-1-sulfonic acid
- Systematic IUPAC name 2-{(2R)-4-[(1R,3aS,3bR,5aR,7R,9aS,9bS,11S,11aR)-7,11-Dihydroxy-9a,11a-dimethylhexadecahydro-1H-cyclopenta[a]phenanthren-1-yl]pentanamido}ethane-1-sulfonic acid

Identifiers
CAS Number	516-50-7
3D model (JSmol)	Interactive image
ChEBI	CHEBI:9410
ChEMBL	ChEMBL412272
ChemSpider	2015539
PubChem CID	2733768
UNII	20668G0RPI
CompTox Dashboard (EPA)	DTXSID00873418
- InChI: InChI=1S/C26H45NO6S/c1-16(4-9-24(30)27-12-13-34(31,32)33)20-7-8-21-19-6-5-17-14-18(28)10-11-25(17,2)22(19)15-23(29)26(20,21)3/h16-23,28-29H,4-15H2,1-3H3,(H,27,30)(H,31,32,33)/t16-,17-,18-,19+,20-,21+,22+,23+,25+,26-/m1/s1 Key: AWDRATDZQPNJFN-VAYUFCLWSA-N; InChI=1/C26H45NO6S/c1-16(4-9-24(30)27-12-13-34(31,32)33)20-7-8-21-19-6-5-17-14-18(28)10-11-25(17,2)22(19)15-23(29)26(20,21)3/h16-23,28-29H,4-15H2,1-3H3,(H,27,30)(H,31,32,33)/t16-,17-,18-,19+,20-,21+,22+,23+,25+,26-/m1/s1 Key: AWDRATDZQPNJFN-VAYUFCLWBR
- SMILES: C[C@H](CCC(=O)NCCS(=O)(=O)O)[C@H]1CC[C@@H]2[C@@]1([C@H](C[C@H]3[C@H]2CC[C@H]4[C@@]3(CC[C@H](C4)O)C)O)C

Properties
Chemical formula	C_{26}H_{45}NO_{6}S
Molar mass	499.71 g·mol^{−1}
- Except where otherwise noted, data are given for materials in their standard state (at 25 °C [77 °F], 100 kPa). verify (what is ?) Infobox references

Taurodeoxycholic acid is a bile acid. This compound is a closely related isomer of taurochenodeoxycholic acid and tauroursodeoxycholic acid sharing the exact molecular formula and molecular weight.

Taurodeoxycholic acid and its isomers have molecular masses similar to perfluorooctanesulfonic acid (PFOS) and therefore may interfere with interpretation of mass spectrometry data, leading to a false indication of the presence of PFOS in a biological sample.

Serum concentration of taurodeoxycholic acid, a downstream microbial metabolite of cholic acid, is associated with a strong increased risk of colorectal cancer among women.

Also, the determination of taurodeoxycholic acid 3-sulfate in blood samples may potentially be useful as a risk factor and screening biomarker for lung cancer prevention.
