= Taurochenodeoxycholic acid =

Names
- IUPAC name 2-(3α,7α-Dihydroxy-5β-cholan-24-amido)ethane-1-sulfonic acid
- Systematic IUPAC name 2-{(4R)-4-[(1R,3aS,3bR,4R,5aS,7R,9aS,9bS,11aR)-4,7-Dihydroxy-9a,11a-dimethylhexadecahydro-1H-cyclopenta[a]phenanthren-1-yl]pentanamido}ethane-1-sulfonic acid
- Other names 12-Deoxycholyltaurine; 12-Desoxycholyltaurine; Chenodeoxycholyltaurine; Chenyltaurine

Identifiers
CAS Number	516-35-8
3D model (JSmol)	Interactive image
ChEBI	CHEBI:16525
ChEMBL	ChEMBL185878
ChemSpider	343282
IUPHAR/BPS	4747
PubChem CID	387316
UNII	651KU15938
CompTox Dashboard (EPA)	DTXSID101020121
- InChI: InChI=1S/C26H45NO6S/c1-16(4-7-23(30)27-12-13-34(31,32)33)19-5-6-20-24-21(9-11-26(19,20)3)25(2)10-8-18(28)14-17(25)15-22(24)29/h16-22,24,28-29H,4-15H2,1-3H3,(H,27,30)(H,31,32,33)/t16-,17+,18-,19-,20+,21+,22-,24+,25+,26-/m1/s1 Key: BHTRKEVKTKCXOH-BJLOMENOSA-N; InChI=1/C26H45NO6S/c1-16(4-7-23(30)27-12-13-34(31,32)33)19-5-6-20-24-21(9-11-26(19,20)3)25(2)10-8-18(28)14-17(25)15-22(24)29/h16-22,24,28-29H,4-15H2,1-3H3,(H,27,30)(H,31,32,33)/t16-,17+,18-,19-,20+,21+,22-,24+,25+,26-/m1/s1 Key: BHTRKEVKTKCXOH-BJLOMENOBE
- SMILES: O=S(=O)(O)CCNC(=O)CC[C@H]([C@H]1CC[C@@H]2[C@]1(C)CC[C@H]4[C@H]2[C@H](O)C[C@@H]3C[C@H](O)CC[C@@]34C)C

Properties
Chemical formula	C_{26}H_{45}NO_{6}S
Molar mass	499.71 g·mol^{−1}
- Except where otherwise noted, data are given for materials in their standard state (at 25 °C [77 °F], 100 kPa). verify (what is ?) Infobox references

Taurochenodeoxycholic acid is a bile acid formed in the liver of most species, including humans, by conjugation of chenodeoxycholic acid with taurine. It is secreted into bile and then into the intestine. It is usually ionized at physiological pH. It can be crystallized as the sodium salt.

It acts as a detergent to solubilize fats in the small intestine and is itself absorbed by active transport in the terminal ileum.

It is used as a cholagogue and choleretic.

Substantial evidence indicates that high circulating bile acids promote colon cancer risk. In a prospective study, positive associations were observed between prediagnostic plasma levels of seven conjugated bile acid metabolites, including taurochenodeoxycholic acid, and colon cancer risk.

== See also ==
- Tauroursodeoxycholic acid, an epimer
- See article about Taurodeoxycholic acid as an interferent in Perfluorooctanesulfonic acid (PFOS) mass spectrometry analysis.
