= Keratinocyte growth factor =

InterPro family

The keratinocyte growth factor (KGF), also known as FGF7, is a growth factor present in the epithelialization-phase of wound healing. In this phase, keratinocytes are covering the wound, forming the epithelium.

KGF is a small signaling molecule that binds to fibroblast growth factor receptor 2b (FGFR2b). For signalling to occur, a dimer is required between two FGF:FGFR complexes that is linked together by a molecule of heparin.

There are 23 known FGFs, and 4 FGF receptors. FGF:FGFR binding is complex and regulated by a variety of mechanisms in a tissue specific manner.

FGF10 is also known as "keratinocyte growth factor 2".

== See also ==
- Palifermin
