= HEC96719 =

Chemical compound

Legal status
- Legal status: Investigational

Identifiers
- IUPAC name: 3-[[5-Cyclopropyl-3-(2,6-dichlorophenyl)-1,2-oxazol-4-yl]methoxy]spiro[6H-[1]benzoxepino[3,2-b]pyridine-5,1'-cyclopropane]-9-carboxylic acid
- CAS Number: 2181834-03-5
- PubChem CID: 138675487
- ChemSpider: 129200607
- ChEMBL: ChEMBL5171962

Chemical and physical data
- Formula: C_{29}H_{22}Cl_{2}N_{2}O_{5}
- Molar mass: 549.40 g·mol^{−1}
- 3D model (JSmol): Interactive image
- SMILES: C1CC1C2=C(C(=NO2)C3=C(C=CC=C3Cl)Cl)COC4=NC5=C(C=C4)OC6=C(CC57CC7)C=CC(=C6)C(=O)O
- InChI: InChI=1S/C29H22Cl2N2O5/c30-19-2-1-3-20(31)24(19)25-18(26(38-33-25)15-4-5-15)14-36-23-9-8-21-27(32-23)29(10-11-29)13-17-7-6-16(28(34)35)12-22(17)37-21/h1-3,6-9,12,15H,4-5,10-11,13-14H2,(H,34,35); Key:JZJOXLSYULKNLW-UHFFFAOYSA-N

HEC96719 is a tricyclic farnesoid X receptor agonist developed for non-alcoholic steatohepatitis.
