= FGF15 =

Mammalian protein found in Mus musculus

Fibroblast growth factor 15

Identifiers
- Organism: Mus musculus
- Symbol: Fgf15
- Entrez: 14170
- Orthologs: NCBI: entry; OMA: entry
- RefSeq (mRNA): NM_008003.2
- RefSeq (Prot): NP_032029.1
- UniProt: O35622

Other data
- Chromosome: 7: 144.9 - 144.9 Mb
Search for
- Structures: Swiss-model
- Domains: InterPro

Fibroblast growth factor 15 is a protein in mouse encoded by the Fgf15 gene. It is a member of the fibroblast growth factor (FGF) family but, like FGF19, FGF21 and FGF23, has endocrine functions. FGF19 is the orthologous protein in humans. They are often referred together as FGF15/19.

== Identification ==
FGF15 was first described in developing mouse brain. There is no human FGF15.

== Structure ==
The mouse Fgf15 gene is syntenic with the human FGF19 gene. FGF15 and FGF19 proteins share about 50% amino acid identity, are found in the same tissues, and have similar functions in mouse and humans.

== Functions ==
FGF15 is found in the absorptive cells of the mouse ileum and plays an important role in feedback inhibition of hepatic bile acid synthesis. FGF15 (and FGF19 in humans) function as hormones produced in response to bile acid absorption acting on the farnesoid X receptor FXR, are secreted into the portal venous circulation and bind onto the liver membrane receptor FGFR4/β-Klotho and repress bile acid synthesis by the Cyp7a1 gene.

In a mouse model of chronic diarrhea due to bile acid malabsorption, FGF15 administration, or stimulation of its production, reduced the bile acid loss by inhibiting new synthesis.

FGF15 has effects on energy homeostasis. Fgf15-knock-out mice have reduced liver glycogen storage and are glucose-intolerant.

FGF15 has been implicated in liver regeneration and repair. Fgf15-deficient mice have impaired regeneration.
