= Fibroblast growth factor receptor 2 =

Protein-coding gene in the species Homo sapiens

FGFR2
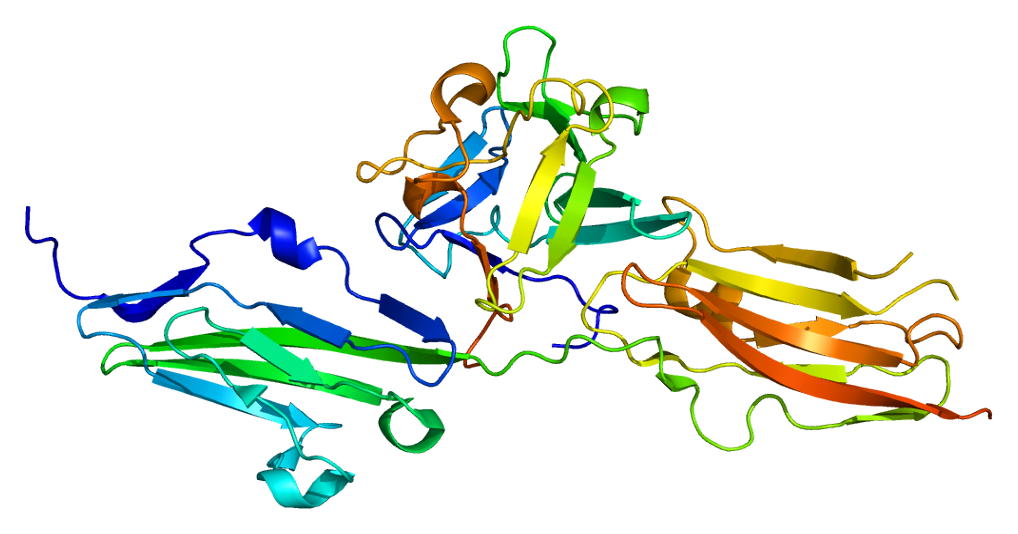

Identifiers
- Aliases: FGFR2, BBDS, BEK, BFR-1, CD332, CEK3, CFD1, ECT1, JWS, K-SAM, KGFR, TK14, TK25, fibroblast growth factor receptor 2
- External IDs: OMIM: 176943; MGI: 95523; GeneCards: FGFR2
Available structures
PDB	Ortholog search: PDBe RCSB
PDB	List of PDB id codes 1DJS, 1E0O, 1EV2, 1GJO, 1II4, 1IIL, 1NUN, 1OEC, 1WVZ, 2FDB, 2PSQ, 2PVF, 2PVY, 2PWL, 2PY3, 2PZ5, 2PZP, 2PZR, 2Q0B, 3B2T, 3CAF, 3CLY, 3CU1, 3DAR, 3EUU, 3OJ2, 3OJM, 3RI1, 4J95, 4J96, 4J97, 4J98, 4J99, 4J23, 4WV1
Enzyme activity
EC #	BRENDA	ExPASy	KEGG	MetaCyc
2.7.10.1	↗	↗	↗	↗

Gene location (Human)
Chr.	Chromosome 10 (human)
Band	10q26.13	Start	121,478,332 bp
Band	10q26.13	End	121,598,458 bp

Gene location (Mouse)
Chr.	Chromosome 7 (mouse)
Band	7|7 F3	Start	129,764,181 bp
Band	7|7 F3	End	132,725,079 bp
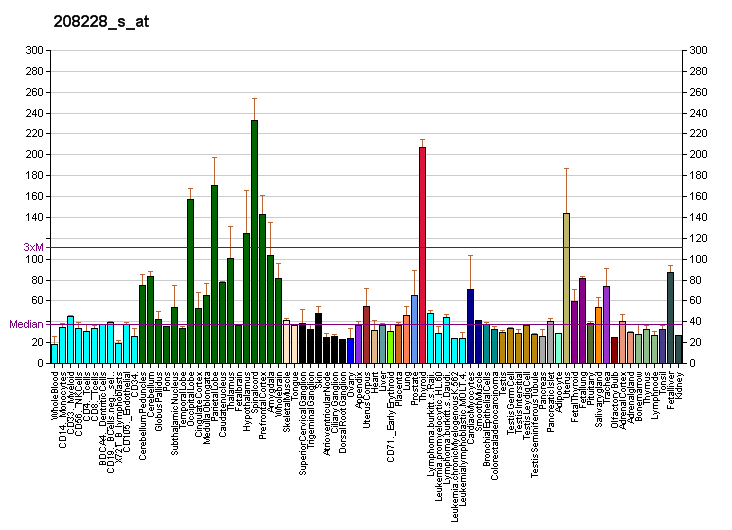

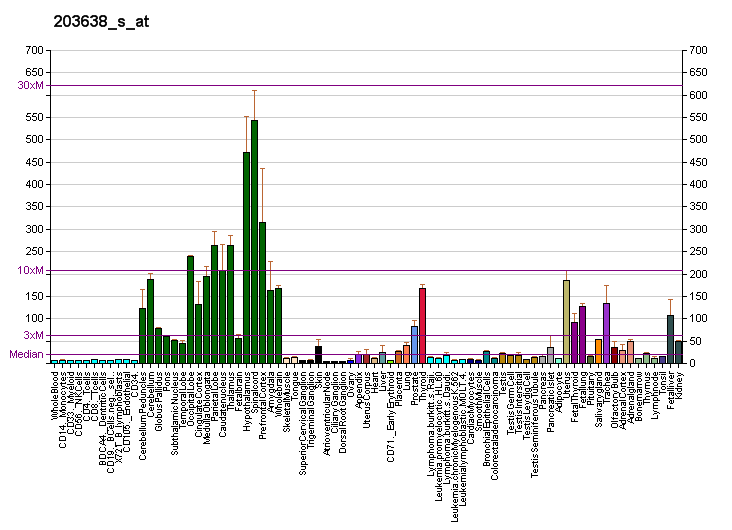

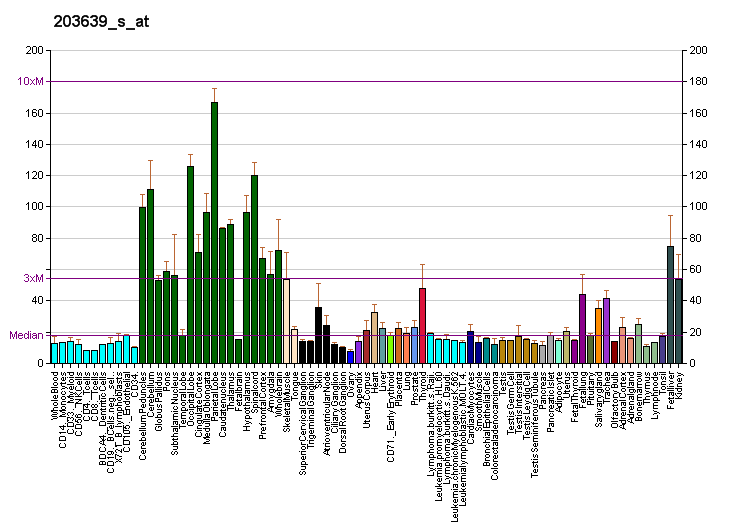
RNA expression pattern
Bgee	Human / Mouse (ortholog); Top expressed in: C1 segment; corpus callosum; inferior olivary nucleus; ventricular zone; parotid gland; inferior ganglion of vagus nerve; external globus pallidus; subthalamic nucleus; substantia nigra; skin of thigh / Top expressed in: calvaria; genital tubercle; adrenal gland; ventricular zone; left lung lobe; choroid plexus of fourth ventricle; epithelium of trachea; retinal pigment epithelium; medullary collecting duct; wall of esophagus; More reference expression data
BioGPS	More reference expression data
Gene ontology
Molecular function	heparin binding; kinase activity; transmembrane receptor protein tyrosine kinase activity; fibroblast growth factor binding; ATP binding; protein kinase activity; fibroblast growth factor-activated receptor activity; transferase activity; protein homodimerization activity; protein binding; nucleotide binding; protein tyrosine kinase activity; 1-phosphatidylinositol-3-kinase activity; phosphatidylinositol-4,5-bisphosphate 3-kinase activity; identical protein binding; receptor tyrosine kinase; transmembrane signaling receptor activity
Cellular component	cytoplasm; membrane; extracellular region; nucleus; cell surface; integral component of membrane; Golgi apparatus; intracellular membrane-bounded organelle; extracellular matrix; plasma membrane; nucleoplasm; cell cortex; integral component of plasma membrane; excitatory synapse; cytoplasmic vesicle; receptor complex; collagen-containing extracellular matrix
Biological process	fibroblast growth factor receptor signaling pathway involved in orbitofrontal cortex development; ureteric bud development; organ growth; limb bud formation; embryonic pattern specification; bud elongation involved in lung branching; positive regulation of canonical Wnt signaling pathway; membranous septum morphogenesis; fibroblast growth factor receptor signaling pathway involved in positive regulation of cell proliferation in bone marrow; embryonic organ morphogenesis; post-embryonic development; squamous basal epithelial stem cell differentiation involved in prostate gland acinus development; branching morphogenesis of a nerve; reproductive structure development; fibroblast growth factor receptor signaling pathway involved in negative regulation of apoptotic process in bone marrow cell; ventricular cardiac muscle tissue morphogenesis; protein phosphorylation; positive regulation of cardiac muscle cell proliferation; mesenchymal cell differentiation; positive regulation of mesenchymal cell proliferation; regulation of osteoblast differentiation; prostate epithelial cord arborization involved in prostate glandular acinus morphogenesis; angiogenesis; prostate gland morphogenesis; positive regulation of ERK1 and ERK2 cascade; orbitofrontal cortex development; negative regulation of epithelial cell proliferation; animal organ morphogenesis; embryonic digestive tract morphogenesis; hair follicle morphogenesis; morphogenesis of embryonic epithelium; branch elongation involved in salivary gland morphogenesis; apoptotic process; branching involved in salivary gland morphogenesis; cell fate commitment; lung development; embryonic organ development; fibroblast growth factor receptor signaling pathway involved in hemopoiesis; in utero embryonic development; lateral sprouting from an epithelium; positive regulation of Wnt signaling pathway; gland morphogenesis; positive regulation of cell cycle; branching involved in labyrinthine layer morphogenesis; branching involved in prostate gland morphogenesis; regulation of ERK1 and ERK2 cascade; protein autophosphorylation; mammary gland bud formation; pyramidal neuron development; lacrimal gland development; positive regulation of MAPK cascade; regulation of smooth muscle cell differentiation; regulation of cell fate commitment; bone mineralization; regulation of branching involved in prostate gland morphogenesis; positive regulation of epithelial cell proliferation involved in lung morphogenesis; epithelial cell differentiation; phosphorylation; multicellular organism growth; positive regulation of epithelial cell proliferation; ventricular zone neuroblast division; epidermis morphogenesis; skeletal system morphogenesis; regulation of morphogenesis of a branching structure; negative regulation of transcription by RNA polymerase II; outflow tract septum morphogenesis; odontogenesis; epithelial to mesenchymal transition; lung alveolus development; lung lobe morphogenesis; midbrain development; positive regulation of smooth muscle cell proliferation; fibroblast growth factor receptor signaling pathway involved in mammary gland specification; mesenchymal cell proliferation involved in lung development; prostate epithelial cord elongation; mesenchymal cell differentiation involved in lung development; axonogenesis; regulation of multicellular organism growth; otic vesicle formation; epithelial cell proliferation involved in salivary gland morphogenesis; cell-cell signaling; regulation of fibroblast growth factor receptor signaling pathway; bone morphogenesis; MAPK cascade; regulation of osteoblast proliferation; positive regulation of phospholipase activity; fibroblast growth factor receptor signaling pathway; regulation of smoothened signaling pathway; inner ear morphogenesis; positive regulation of cell population proliferation; mesodermal cell differentiation; peptidyl-tyrosine phosphorylation; digestive tract development; lung-associated mesenchyme development; bone development; positive regulation of cell division; positive regulation of transcription by RNA polymerase II; phosphatidylinositol phosphate biosynthetic process; phosphatidylinositol-3-phosphate biosynthetic process; endochondral bone growth; response to lipopolysaccharide; wound healing; cellular response to fibroblast growth factor stimulus; response to ethanol; cellular response to retinoic acid; cellular response to transforming growth factor beta stimulus; embryonic cranial skeleton morphogenesis; positive regulation of protein kinase B signaling; negative regulation of signal transduction; cell differentiation; negative regulation of apoptotic process; transmembrane receptor protein tyrosine kinase signaling pathway
Sources:Amigo / QuickGO
Orthologs
Databases	NCBI: entry; OMA: entry
Species	Human	Mouse
Entrez	2263	14183
Ensembl	ENSG00000066468	ENSMUSG00000030849
UniProt	P21802	P21803
RefSeq (mRNA)	NM_000141; NM_001144913; NM_001144914; NM_001144915; NM_001144916 NM_001144917; NM_001144918; NM_001144919; NM_022970; NM_022971; NM_022972; NM_022973; NM_022974; NM_022975; NM_022976; NM_023028; NM_023029; NM_023030; NM_001320654; NM_001320658; NM_023031	NM_010207; NM_201601; NM_001347638
RefSeq (protein)	NP_000132; NP_001138385; NP_001138386; NP_001138387; NP_001138388 NP_001138389; NP_001138390; NP_001138391; NP_001307583; NP_001307587; NP_075259; NP_075418	NP_001334567; NP_034337; NP_963895
Location (UCSC)	Chr 10: 121.48 – 121.6 Mb	Chr 7: 129.76 – 132.73 Mb
PubMed search
- Wikidata
View/Edit Human	View/Edit Mouse

Fibroblast growth factor receptor 2 (FGFR-2) also known as CD332 (cluster of differentiation 332) is a protein that in humans is encoded by the FGFR2 gene residing on chromosome 10. FGFR2 is a receptor for fibroblast growth factor.

FGFR-2 is a member of the fibroblast growth factor receptor family, where amino acid sequence is highly conserved between members and throughout evolution. FGFR family members differ from one another in their ligand affinities and tissue distribution. A full-length representative protein consists of an extracellular region, composed of three immunoglobulin domains, a single hydrophobic membrane-spanning segment and a cytoplasmic tyrosine kinase domain. The extracellular portion of the protein interacts with fibroblast growth factors, setting in motion a cascade of downstream signals, ultimately influencing mitogenesis and differentiation. This particular family member is a high-affinity receptor for acidic, basic and/or keratinocyte growth factor, depending on the isoform.

== Function ==
FGFR2 has important roles in embryonic development and tissue repair, especially bone and blood vessels. Like the other members of the fibroblast growth factor receptor family, these receptors signal by binding to their ligand and dimerisation (pairing of receptors), which causes the tyrosine kinase domains to initiate a cascade of intracellular signals. On a molecular level these signals mediate cell division, growth and differentiation.

== Isoforms ==
FGFR2 has two naturally occurring isoforms, FGFR2IIIb and FGFR2IIIc, created by splicing of the third immunoglobulin-like domain. FGFR2IIIb is predominantly found in ectoderm derived tissues and endothelial organ lining, i.e. skin and internal organs. FGFR2IIIc is found in mesenchyme, which includes craniofacial bone and for this reason the mutations of this gene and isoform are associated with craniosynostosis.

== Interactions ==
Fibroblast growth factor receptor 2 has been shown to interact with FGF1.

The spliced isoforms, however differ in binding:

- FGFR2IIIb binds to FGF-1, -3, -7, -10, -22
- FGFR2IIIc binds to FGF-1, -2, -4, -6, -8, -9, -17 and -18

These differences in binding are not surprising, since FGF ligand is known to bind to the second and third immunoglobulin domain of the receptor.

== Clinical significance ==
Mutations (changes) are associated with numerous medical conditions that include abnormal bone development (e.g. craniosynostosis syndromes) and cancer.

=== Craniosynostosis syndromes ===
FGFR2 mutations are the cause of several craniosynostosis syndromes:

- Acrocephalosyndactyly type 1 (Apert syndrome)
- Beare-Stevenson cutis gyrata syndrome
- Crouzon syndrome
- Jackson-Weiss syndrome
- Pfeiffer syndrome

=== Cancer ===
- Breast cancer, a mutation or single nucleotide polymorphism (SNP) in intron 2 of the FGFR2 gene is associated with a higher breast cancer risk; however the risk is only mildly increased from about 10% lifetime breast cancer risk in the average woman in the industrialized world, to 12-14% risk in carriers of the SNP.

Missense mutations of FGFR2 have been found in endometrial cancer and melanoma.

=== Bent bone dysplasia ===
Bent bone dysplasia is an extremely rare congenital skeletal condition caused by FGFR2 mutation.

== As a drug target ==
AZD4547 is a tyrosine kinase inhibitor which targets FGFR1-3. It has demonstrated early evidence of efficacy in gastric cancer patients with high level FGFR2 amplification (Cancer Discovery 2016). FPA144 is a monoclonal antibody that binds to FGFR2b (a form of FGFR2) and preventing binding of certain FGFs. In 2014, a clinical trial began to treat gastric tumours that overexpress FGFR2b. Another approach of FGFR2 targeting is use of allosteric inhibitors. Alofanib is a novel first-in-class allosteric small-molecular inhibitor of FGFR2. It binds to the extracellular domain of FGFR2 and has an inhibitory effect on FGF2-induced phosphorylation. Principal benefits of allosteric inhibitors are high selectivity and low toxicity [Tsimafeyeu et al. ESMO Asia 2016]. A phase Ib clinical study protocol has been selected for ECCO-AACR-EORTC-ESMO Workshop on Methods in Clinical Cancer Research, better known as the ‘Flims’ Workshop and clinical study of safety and preliminary efficacy of alofanib will be initiated at the beginning of 2017.

== Mutations ==
FGFR2 mutations are associated with craniosynostosis syndromes, which are skull malformations caused by premature fusion of cranial sutures and other disease features according to the mutation itself. Analysis of chromosomal anomalies in patients led to the identification and confirmation of FGFR2 as a cleft lip and/or palate locus. On a molecular level, mutations that affect FGFR2IIIc are associated with marked changes in osteoblast proliferation and differentiation. Alteration in FGFR2 signalling is thought to underlie the craniosynostosis syndromes. To date, there are two mechanisms of altered FGFR2 signalling. The first is associated with constitutive activation of FGFR, where the FGFR2 receptor is always signalling, regardless of the amount of FGF ligand. This mechanism is found in patients with Crouzon and Pfeiffer syndrome. The second, which is associated with Apert syndrome is a loss of specificity of the FGFR2 isoform, resulting in the receptor binding to FGFs that it does not normally bind.

== See also ==
- Cluster of differentiation
