= Aldafermin =

Clinical data
- Other names: NGM282; NGM-282

Legal status
- Legal status: Investigational

Identifiers
- CAS Number: 1616639-03-2
- IUPHAR/BPS: 11546
- UNII: IK9NYN31ZM
- KEGG: D11734
- ChEMBL: ChEMBL4298055

Aldafermin is a fibroblast growth factor 19 (FGF19) analogue developed for non-alcoholic steatohepatitis.
