= Mir-433 =

mir-433
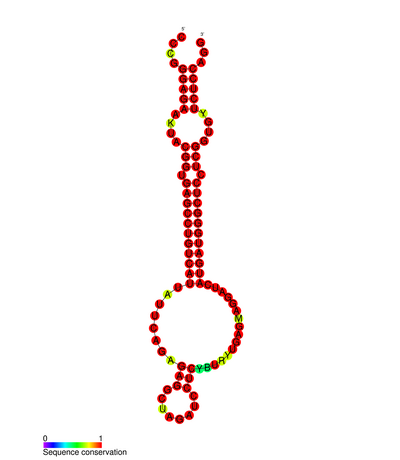
- miR-433 microRNA secondary structure and sequence conservation

Identifiers
- Symbol: mir-433
- Rfam: RF00748
- miRBase family: MIPF0000177
- NCBI Gene: 574034
- HGNC: 32026
- OMIM: 611711

Other data
- RNA type: microRNA
- Domain(s): Eukaryota; Eutheria;
- PDB structures: PDBe

In molecular biology, mir-433 is a short non-coding RNA molecule. MicroRNAs (miRNAs) function as posttranscriptional regulators of expression levels of other genes by several mechanisms. They play roles in development, metabolism and carcinogenesis.

== Genomic structure and regulation ==
Mir-433 is one of 21 miRNAs found in a cluster on chromosome 12.

The 3′ coding region of mir-433 is also the promoter of the neighbouring miRNA gene: mir-127. The two genes overlap and are transcribed in the same orientation. This is a method by which genetic information can be stored in a compact and efficient way.

Mir-433, along with the other twenty genes in the cluster, is upregulated in small heterodimer partner (SHP) homozygous knockout mice.

SHP is a nuclear receptor known to repress transcription, and it has a role in some metabolic diseases. Conversely, the transcription of mir-433 has been shown to be activated by estrogen related receptor (ERR).[3]

Mir-433 is highly conserved across species, being 95% similar in the human, chimpanzee, horse, dog, monkey, rat, cow and mouse. The distance between mir-433 and mir-127 was also similar across these species; as was the positioning of transcription factor binding motifs, including that for ERR. This indicates that the gene regulation, as well as the primary sequence, is conserved across these mammalian species.

It is also suggested that mir-433 and mir-127 are likely to have originated from a common ancestral gene.

== Disease association ==
Levels of mir-433 have been found to be elevated in gastric carcinoma, by investigation with miRNA gene microarrays. Mir-433 regulates the expression of GRB2, a known tumour-associated protein, which may be the explanation for this association.

No such association was found between mir-433 variation and Parkinson's disease despite the fact that variation in the region of the FGF20 gene which binds to mir-433, is associated with Parkinson's disease.

Mir-433 has also been associated with a dominantly inherited form of x linked chondrodysplasia. Mir-433 normally downregulates the expression of HDAC6. A single nucleotide polymorphism (SNP) in the 3′ untranslated region (UTR) of HDAC6 was found to segregate with the chondrodysplasia. This SNP removes the ability of mir-433 to downregulate HDAC6, resulting in its overexpression. Consequently, there is reduced acetylation of its target, alpha tubulin, causing disease.

== See also ==
- MicroRNA
- mir-127
