= Omesdafexor =

Chemical compound

Clinical data
- Other names: MET409

Legal status
- Legal status: Investigational

Identifiers
- IUPAC name: N-[3-(1-cyclopropylpyrazol-4-yl)phenyl]-4-hydroxy-N-[[4-(4-methoxy-3-methylphenyl)cyclohexyl]methyl]cyclohexane-1-carboxamide
- CAS Number: 2244440-85-3
- PubChem CID: 135329968
- ChemSpider: 128921646
- UNII: E05WEZ4XLE

Chemical and physical data
- Formula: C_{34}H_{43}N_{3}O_{3}
- Molar mass: 541.736 g·mol^{−1}
- 3D model (JSmol): Interactive image
- SMILES: N(C[C@@H]1CC[C@H](CC1)C2=CC(C)=C(OC)C=C2)(C(=O)[C@@H]3CC[C@@H](O)CC3)C4=CC(=CC=C4)C5=CN(N=C5)C6CC6
- InChI: InChI=1/C34H43N3O3/c1-23-18-28(12-17-33(23)40-2)25-8-6-24(7-9-25)21-36(34(39)26-10-15-32(38)16-11-26)31-5-3-4-27(19-31)29-20-35-37(22-29)30-13-14-30/h3-5,12,17-20,22,24-26,30,32,38H,6-11,13-16,21H2,1-2H3/t24-,25-,26-,32-; Key:RPBNLMPTFCTXRQ-RYYHSFPWNA-N

Omesdafexor (MET409) is a small-molecule farnesoid X receptor (FXR) agonist developed for nonalcoholic steatohepatitis and colitis.
