= Fexaramine =

Chemical compound

Identifiers
- IUPAC name: Methyl (E)-3-[3-[cyclohexanecarbonyl-[[4-[4-(dimethylamino)phenyl]phenyl]methyl]amino]phenyl]prop-2-enoate
- CAS Number: 574013-66-4
- PubChem CID: 5326713
- IUPHAR/BPS: 2744
- DrugBank: DB02545
- ChemSpider: 4484057
- UNII: WTG9GFA65U
- KEGG: C15649
- ChEBI: CHEBI:80003
- ChEMBL: ChEMBL192966
- CompTox Dashboard (EPA): DTXSID80870369

Chemical and physical data
- Formula: C_{32}H_{36}N_{2}O_{3}
- Molar mass: 496.651 g·mol^{−1}
- 3D model (JSmol): Interactive image
- SMILES: CN(C)C1=CC=C(C=C1)C2=CC=C(C=C2)CN(C3=CC=CC(=C3)/C=C/C(=O)OC)C(=O)C4CCCCC4

Fexaramine is an investigational compound which acts as an agonist of the farnesoid X receptor (FXR), which is a bile acid-activated nuclear receptor that controls bile-acid synthesis, conjugation and transport, as well as lipid metabolism through actions in the liver and intestine.

The first publication about fexaramine in 2003 showed it has 100-fold greater affinity for FXR than natural compounds and described the genomic targets and binding site on FXR.

When administered orally to mice, fexaramine produced selective actions through FXR receptors in the intestines. Consistent with the effects of other FXR agonist drugs, in a study in mice, oral fexaramine stimulated intestinal fibroblast growth factor 15 (FGF15) production and resulted in metabolic improvements. Intestinal tissue-specific actions of fexaramine were suggested to be a possible new approach for the treatment of obesity and metabolic syndrome. However it cannot be determined from these preliminary results in mice whether FXR agonism with fexaramine will produce weight loss in humans. There are no clinical trials of fexaramine planned in humans and therapy with such FXR agonists for obesity is only a theoretical approach.

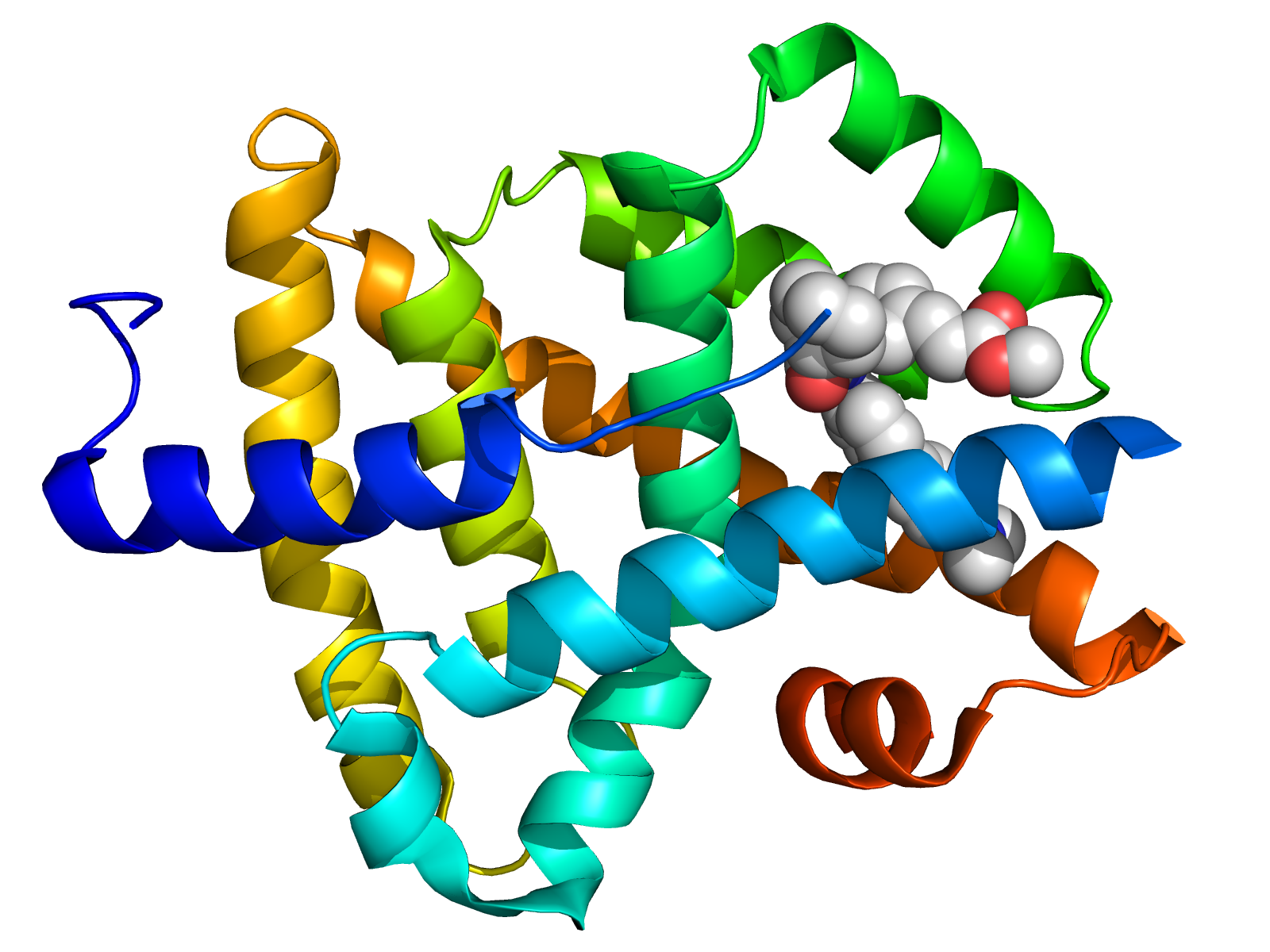
Crystallographic structure of the ligand binding domain of the farnesoid X receptor (rainbow colored cartoon, N-terminus = blue, C-terminus = red) complexed with fexaramine depicted as spheres (carbon = white, oxygen = red, nitrogen = blue).
