= EDP-305 =

Chemical compound

Legal status
- Legal status: Investigational

Identifiers
- IUPAC name: 1-(4-tert-Butylphenyl)sulfonyl-3-[(3R)-3-[(3R,5S,6R,7R,8S,9S,10S,13R,14S,17R)-6-ethyl-3,7-dihydroxy-10,13-dimethyl-2,3,4,5,6,7,8,9,11,12,14,15,16,17-tetradecahydro-1H-cyclopenta[a]phenanthren-17-yl]butyl]urea
- CAS Number: 1933507-63-1
- PubChem CID: 121428882
- ChemSpider: 123963190
- UNII: 7716RH2FJT

Chemical and physical data
- Formula: C_{36}H_{58}N_{2}O_{5}S
- Molar mass: 630.93 g·mol^{−1}
- 3D model (JSmol): Interactive image
- SMILES: CC[C@@H]1[C@@H]2C[C@@H](CC[C@@]2([C@H]3CC[C@]4([C@H]([C@@H]3[C@@H]1O)CC[C@@H]4[C@H](C)CCNC(=O)NS(=O)(=O)C5=CC=C(C=C5)C(C)(C)C)C)C)O
- InChI: InChI=1S/C36H58N2O5S/c1-8-26-30-21-24(39)15-18-36(30,7)29-16-19-35(6)27(13-14-28(35)31(29)32(26)40)22(2)17-20-37-33(41)38-44(42,43)25-11-9-23(10-12-25)34(3,4)5/h9-12,22,24,26-32,39-40H,8,13-21H2,1-7H3,(H2,37,38,41)/t22-,24-,26-,27-,28+,29+,30+,31+,32-,35-,36-/m1/s1; Key:SJKLCUGQVVYDCX-HRNVLBFRSA-N

EDP-305 is a non-bile acid farnesoid X receptor (FXR) agonist developed by Enanta Pharmaceuticals for non-alcoholic fatty liver disease. According to preclinical research CYP3A4 is the main enzyme used to metabolize the drug and there is a low potential for drug interactions.
