= FGF11 =

Identifiers
- Aliases: FGF11, FHF3, FGF-11, FHF-3, fibroblast growth factor 11
- External IDs: OMIM: 601514; MGI: 109167; GeneCards: FGF11

Gene location (Human)
Chr.	Chromosome 17 (human)
Band	17p13.1	Start	7,438,273 bp
Band	17p13.1	End	7,444,937 bp
RNA expression pattern
Bgee	Human / Mouse (ortholog); Top expressed in: left adrenal cortex; right adrenal gland; right adrenal cortex; skin of abdomen; skin of leg; right auricle of heart; gonad; vagina; ganglionic eminence; amygdala / n/a; More reference expression data
BioGPS	n/a
Gene ontology
Molecular function	growth factor activity
Cellular component	extracellular region
Biological process	cell-cell signaling; signal transduction; nervous system development; regulation of signaling receptor activity
Sources:Amigo / QuickGO
Orthologs
Databases	NCBI: entry; OMA: entry
Species	Human	Mouse
Entrez	2256	14166
Ensembl	ENSG00000283903; ENSG00000161958	n/a
UniProt	Q92914	P70378
RefSeq (mRNA)	NM_001303460; NM_004112	NM_001291104; NM_010198; NM_001362623; NM_001362624
RefSeq (protein)	NP_001290389; NP_004103	NP_001278033; NP_034328; NP_001349552; NP_001349553
Location (UCSC)	Chr 17: 7.44 – 7.44 Mb	n/a
PubMed search
- Wikidata
View/Edit Human	View/Edit Mouse

Fibroblast growth factor 11 also known as FGF11 is a human gene.

The protein encoded by this gene is a member of the intracellular fibroblast growth factor family. The function of FGF11 is unknown.
