= Mir-127 =

mir-127
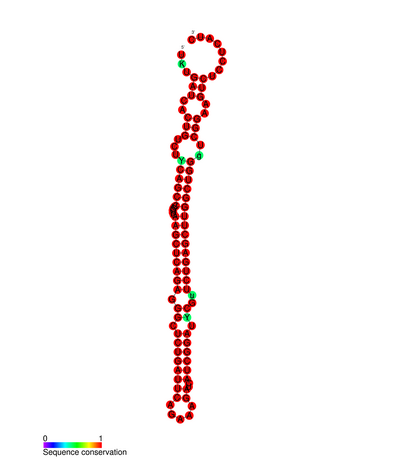
- miR-127 microRNA secondary structure and sequence conservation

Identifiers
- Symbol: mir-127
- Rfam: RF00676
- miRBase family: MIPF0000080
- NCBI Gene: 406914
- HGNC: 31509
- OMIM: 611709

Other data
- RNA type: microRNA
- Domain: Eukaryota;
- PDB structures: PDBe

mir-127 microRNA is a short non-coding RNA molecule with interesting overlapping gene structure. miR-127 functions to regulate the expression levels of genes involved in lung development, placental formation and apoptosis. Aberrant expression of miR-127 has been linked to different cancers.

== Gene structure ==
pri-miR-127 is derived from a separate but overlapping conserved gene cluster coding for miR-433/127. miR-127 and miR-433 are overlapped in a 5'-3' direction. Although the loci could be found on different chromosomes in different species, the structure has been conserved. In mammals including human, chimpanzee, horse, dog, monkey, rat, cow, and mouse, multiple sequence alignments (MSA) between miR-433 and miR127 have shown 95-100% similarity with a conserved distance between miR-433 and miR-127 of 986 to 1007 bp. Moreover, the upstream response elements in the miR-433/127 promoters, including estrogen related receptors response element (ERRE) have been conserved among above species. Data have suggested that that miR-433/127 loci may have evolved from a common gene of origin.

== Transcription regulation ==
Transcription factor binding sites positioned upstream of miRNA precursor play a role in regulating transcription. Activation of miR-127 and miR-433 promoters is mediated by estrogen-related receptor gamma (ERRgamma, NR3B3), which physically associates with their endogenous promoters. Inhibition is regulated by Small heterodimer partner (SHP), which acts in trans. Although miR-127 and miR-433 have common regulatory elements, they have independent promoters and their differential expression pattern is observed.

== Functional roles ==
=== Down-regulation of the imprinted gene Rtl1 ===
Rtl1 is a key gene in placenta formation and the loss or overexpression of Rlt1 have led to late-fetal or neonatal lethality in mice. miR-127 is located near CpG islands in the imprinted region encoding rtl1 and is normally transcribed in an antisense orientation to the gene. Ectopic expression of miR-127 resulted in a reduction in Rtl1 expression in Human Hela cell and mouse Heppa-1.

Experiments performed in mice showed that Rtl1 was only transcribed from the paternal chromosome, while the maternal allele was degraded. miR-127 and miR-136 however, are only maternally expressed in the somatic cells and thus play a role in antisense regulation of Rtl1 imprinting. Aberrant methylation status of Rtl1 and miR-127 indicated that epigenetic programming is also involved in the process.

=== Control of fetal lung development ===
miR-127 is highly expressed in late state of fetal development. A disruption to the system by overexpressing miR-127 in a fetal lung organ culture system resulted in defective development shown by a decrease in terminal bud counts and varied bud sizes.

== Role in disease ==
=== Diffuse large B-cell lymphoma ===
Upregulation of miR-127 caused a downregulation of B-cell lymphoma 6 protein, a proto-oncogene which is usually hypermutated in diffuse large B-cell lymphoma (DLCL). Moreover, differential expression of miR-127 was detected in different type of DLCL. miR-127 levels were significantly higher in the testicular DLCL compared with the nodal and central nervous system DLCL, implying different biological entity of DLCL in different locations.

=== Hepatocellular carcinoma ===
Inhibition of miR-127 expression is linked with Hepatocellular carcinoma. The mechanistic link was confirmed by a change in BCL6 protein, which is targeted by miR-127.

== See also ==
- MicroRNA
