= FGF15/19 =

Two orthologous fibroblast growth factors

FGF15/19 refers to two orthologous fibroblast growth factors which share 50% amino acid identity and have similar functions. FGF15 was described in the mouse; FGF19 was found in humans and other species. They share physiological functions and so are often referred to as FGF15/19 or as FGF15/FGF19.

They were first described in developing fetal brain. They are now known to be produced in the ileum, and under certain circumstances in the liver and biliary tree. It is thought their principal function is in response to bile acid absorption occurring after meals.

FGF15 and FGF19 have similar roles in regulating bile acid synthesis and also glucose metabolism in the liver.
