= FGF19 =

Protein-coding gene in the species Homo sapiens

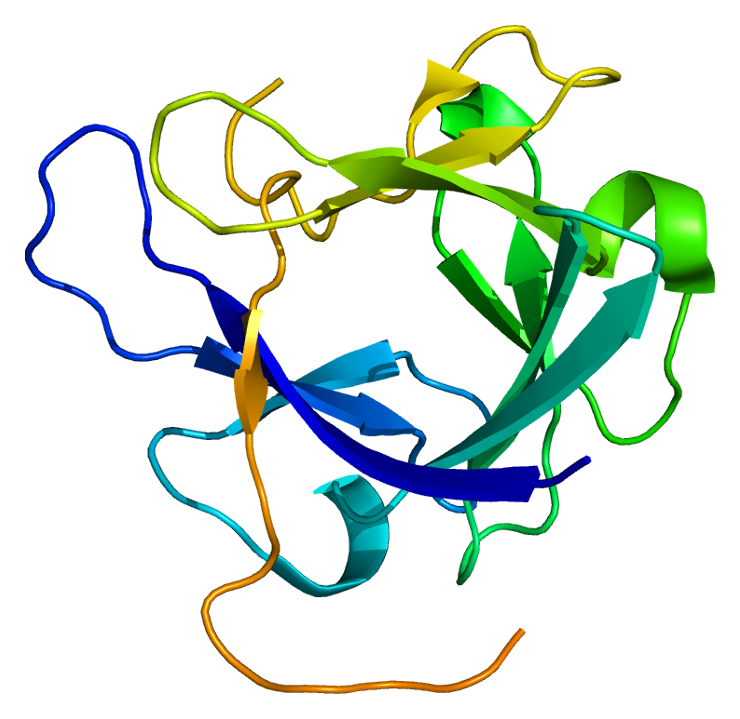

Identifiers
- Aliases: FGF19, fibroblast growth factor 19
- External IDs: OMIM: 603891; MGI: 1096383; GeneCards: FGF19
Available structures
PDB	Ortholog search: PDBe RCSB
PDB	List of PDB id codes 1PWA, 2P23

Gene location (Human)
Chr.	Chromosome 11 (human)
Band	11q13.3	Start	69,698,238 bp
Band	11q13.3	End	69,704,022 bp

Gene location (Mouse)
Chr.	Chromosome 7 (mouse)
Band	7|7 F5	Start	144,896,531 bp
Band	7|7 F5	End	144,900,953 bp
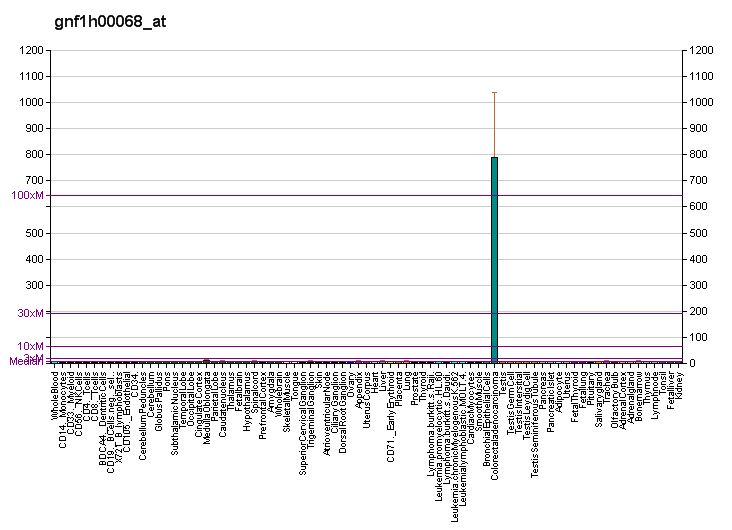
RNA expression pattern
Bgee	Human / Mouse (ortholog); Top expressed in: gallbladder; gonad; islet of Langerhans; sural nerve; small intestine; mucosa of small intestine; duodenum; cerebellar cortex; cerebellar hemisphere; right hemisphere of cerebellum / Top expressed in: gray matter layer of cerebellum; dorsal nucleus of lateral geniculate body; Purkinje cell; embryo; embryo; primitive streak; tail of embryo; epiblast; medial habenular nucleus; pretectal area; More reference expression data
BioGPS	More reference expression data
Gene ontology
Molecular function	fibroblast growth factor receptor binding; protein binding; growth factor activity; phosphatidylinositol-4,5-bisphosphate 3-kinase activity; 1-phosphatidylinositol-3-kinase activity
Cellular component	extracellular region; intracellular anatomical structure
Biological process	positive regulation of glucose import; positive regulation of protein phosphorylation; positive regulation of JNK cascade; negative regulation of gene expression; nervous system development; MAPK cascade; fibroblast growth factor receptor signaling pathway; positive regulation of cell population proliferation; positive regulation of ERK1 and ERK2 cascade; phosphatidylinositol phosphate biosynthetic process; phosphatidylinositol-3-phosphate biosynthetic process; regulation of signaling receptor activity; positive regulation of protein kinase B signaling; neural crest cell migration; development of the heart; negative regulation of bile acid biosynthetic process; response to bacterium
Sources:Amigo / QuickGO
Orthologs
Databases	NCBI: entry; OMA: entry
Species	Human	Mouse
Entrez	9965	14170
Ensembl	ENSG00000162344	ENSMUSG00000031073
UniProt	O95750	O35622
RefSeq (mRNA)	NM_005117	NM_008003
RefSeq (protein)	NP_005108	NP_032029
Location (UCSC)	Chr 11: 69.7 – 69.7 Mb	Chr 7: 144.9 – 144.9 Mb
PubMed search
- Wikidata
View/Edit Human	View/Edit Mouse

Fibroblast growth factor 19 is a protein that in humans is encoded by the FGF19 gene. It functions as a hormone, regulating bile acid synthesis, with effects on glucose and lipid metabolism. Reduced synthesis, and blood levels, may be a factor in chronic bile acid diarrhea and in certain metabolic disorders.

== Functions ==
The protein encoded by this gene is a member of the fibroblast growth factor (FGF) family. FGF family members possess broad mitogenic and cell survival activities, and are involved in a variety of biological processes including embryonic development cell growth, morphogenesis, tissue repair, tumor growth and invasion. This growth factor is a high affinity, heparin dependent ligand for FGFR4. Expression of this gene was detected only in fetal but not adult brain tissue. Synergistic interaction of the chick homolog and Wnt-8c has been shown to be required for initiation of inner ear development.

The orthologous protein in mouse is FGF15, which shares about 50% amino acid identity and has similar functions. Together they are often referred to as FGF15/19.

FGF19 has important roles as a hormone produced in the ileum in response to bile acid absorption. Bile acids bind to the farnesoid X receptor (FXR), stimulating FGF19 transcription. Several FXR / bile acid response elements have been identified in the FGF19 gene. Human FGF19 transcripts have been shown to be stimulated approximately 300-fold by physiological concentrations of bile acids including chenodeoxycholic acid, glycochenodeoxycholic acid and obeticholic acid in explants of ileal mucosa.

FGF19 regulates new bile acid synthesis, acting through the FGFR4/Klotho-β receptor complexes in the liver to inhibit CYP7A1.

FGF19 also has metabolic effects, affecting glucose and lipid metabolism when used in experimental mouse models.

When FGF19 was inhibited by specific anti-FGF19 antibodies in monkeys, severe diarrhea was the result. There was also evidence of liver toxicity. Increases in bile acid synthesis, serum and fecal total bile acids, and specific bile acid transporters were found.

== Role as a cancer promoter ==
FGF19 is frequently amplified in human cancers. Amplification of the FGF19 genomic locus was found in liver cancer, breast cancer, lung cancer, prostate cancer, bladder cancer, and esophageal cancer, among others. Targeting FGF19 inhibits tumor growth in colon cancer cells and hepatocellar carcinoma. Increase in FGF19 correlates with tumor progression and poorer prognosis of hepatocellular carcinoma.

== Clinical significance ==
Patients with chronic diarrhea due to bile acid malabsorption have been shown to have reduced fasting FGF19. Surgical resection of the ileum (as often occurs in Crohn's disease) will reduce bile acid absorption and remove the stimulus for FGF19 production.

In primary bile acid diarrhea, absorption of bile acids is usually normal, but defective FGF19 production can produce excessive bile acid synthesis, as shown by increased levels of 7α-hydroxy-4-cholesten-3-one, and excessive bile acid fecal loss, indicated by reduced SeHCAT retention. This was confirmed in a prospective study of patients with chronic diarrhea, where the predictive value for FGF19 in diagnosis of primary bile acid diarrhea and response to bile acid sequestrants was demonstrated.

FGF19 is also found in the liver of patients with cholestasis. It can be synthesised in the gall-bladder and secreted into bile. FGF19 is expressed in around half of hepatocellular carcinomas and was associated with larger size, early recurrence and poor prognosis.

Patients with the metabolic syndrome, non-alcoholic fatty liver disease and insulin resistance have reduced levels of FGF19. FGF19 increases to normal values in obese patients who undergo Roux-en-Y gastric bypass and other types of bariatric surgery.
