= Gyrification =

Formation of the folds of the brain's cerebral cortex

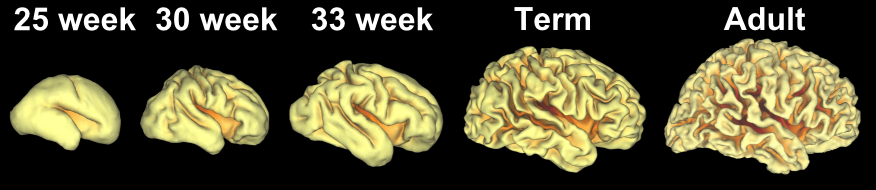
Gyrification in the human brain

Gyrification is the process of forming the characteristic folds of the cerebral cortex. The peak of such a fold is called a gyrus (pl. gyri), and its trough is called a sulcus (pl. sulci). The neurons of the cerebral cortex reside in a thin layer of gray matter, only 2–4 mm thick, at the surface of the brain. Much of the interior volume is occupied by white matter, which consists of long axonal projections to and from the cortical neurons residing near the surface. Gyrification allows a larger cortical surface area, and hence greater cognitive functionality to fit inside a smaller cranium.

In most mammals, gyrification begins during fetal development. Primates, cetaceans, and ungulates have extensive cortical gyri, with a few species exceptions, while small rodents such as the rat, and mouse have none. Gyrification in some animals, for example the ferret, continues well into postnatal life.

== Human brain development ==
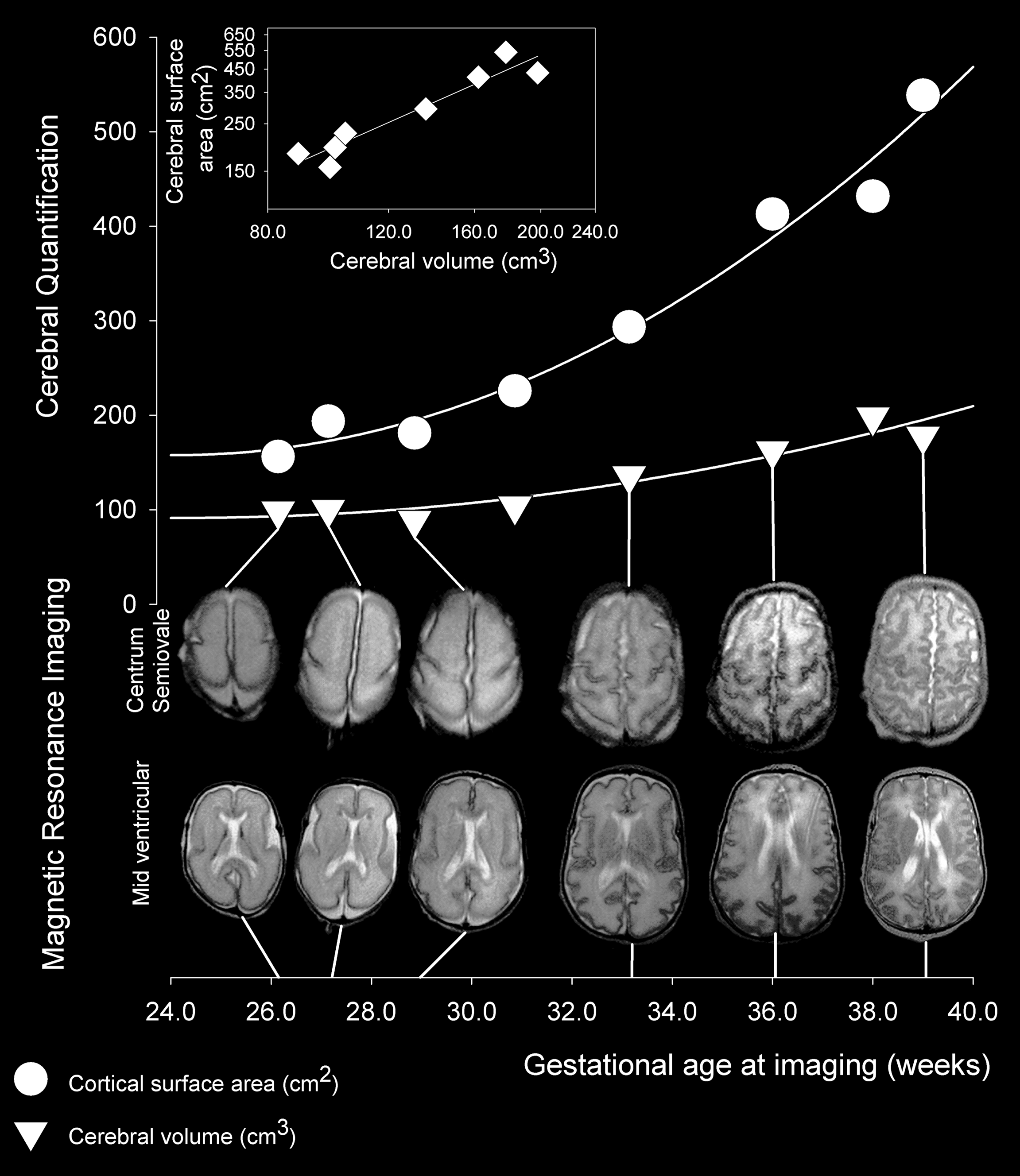
Human cortical development.

As fetal development proceeds, gyri and sulci begin to take shape with the emergence of deepening indentations on the surface of the cortex. Not all gyri begin to develop at the same time. Instead, the primary cortical gyri form first (beginning as early as gestational week 10 in humans), followed by secondary and tertiary gyri later in development. One of the first and most prominent sulci is the lateral sulcus (also known as the lateral fissure or Sylvian fissure), followed by others such as the central sulcus, which separates the motor cortex (precentral gyrus) from somatosensory cortex (postcentral gyrus). Most cortical gyri and sulci begin to take shape between weeks 24 and 38 of gestation, and continue to enlarge and mature after birth.

== Evolutionary advantages ==
One advantage of gyrification is thought to be increased speed of brain cell communication, since cortical folds allow for cells to be closer to one other, requiring less time and energy to transmit neuronal electrical impulses, termed action potentials. There is evidence to suggest a positive relationship between gyrification and cognitive information processing speed, as well as better verbal working memory. Additionally, because a large cranium requires a larger pelvis during childbirth, with implied difficulty in bipedalism, a smaller cranium is more easily delivered.

== Theories on causality ==
=== Mechanical buckling ===
The mechanisms of cortical gyrification are not well understood, and several hypotheses are debated in the scientific literature. A popular hypothesis dating back to the time of Retzius in the late 19th century asserts that mechanical buckling forces due to the expanding brain tissue cause the cortical surface to fold. Many theories since have been loosely tied to this hypothesis.

An external growth constraint of the cranium is not thought to cause gyrification. This is primarily because the primordium of the cranium during the period of fetal brain development is not yet ossified (hardened into the bone through calcification). The tissue covering the embryonic cerebral cortex is several thin layers of ectoderm (future skin) and mesenchyme (future muscle and connective tissue, including the future cranium). These thin layers grow easily along with cortical expansion but eventually, the cranial mesenchyme differentiates into cartilage; ossification of the cranial plates does not occur until later in development. The human cranium continues to grow substantially along with the brain after birth until the cranial plates finally fuse after several years. Experimental studies in animals have furthermore shown that cortical folding can occur without external constraints. Cranial growth is thus thought to be driven by brain growth; mechanical and genetic factors intrinsic to the brain are now thought to be the primary drivers of gyrification. The only observed role that the cranium may play in gyrification is in flattening of gyri as the brain matures after the cranial plates fuse.

=== Axonal tension ===
An alternative theory suggests that axonal tension forces between highly interconnected cortical areas pull local cortical areas towards each other, inducing folds. This model has been criticised: A numerical computer simulation could not produce a biologically realistic folding pattern. One study showed that gyrification can be experimentally induced in the embryonic mouse, but at early stages in the absence of axonal connections.

=== Differential tangential expansion ===
A later theory of differential tangential expansion has been proposed, stating that folding patterns of the brain are a result of different tangential expansion rates between different cortical areas. This is proposed to be due to areal differences in early progenitor division rates.

== Mechanical factors ==
=== Cortical thickness ===
Early conditions of the brain have a strong influence on its final level of gyrification. In particular, there is an inverse relationship between cortical thickness and gyrification. Areas of the brain with low values of thickness are found to have higher levels of gyrification. The reverse is also true, that areas of the brain with high values of thickness are found to have lower levels of gyrification.

=== Growth speed ===
There is some dispute over the growth rates through which cortical and subcortical layers of the brain develop. Purely isotropic growth suggests that the grey (outer shell) and white matter (inner core) layers each grow at separate rates, that are uniform in all dimensions. Tangential growth suggests that the grey matter grows at a faster rate than the inner white matter and that the growth rate of the grey matter determines the growth rate of the white matter. Though both methods are differential, with the cortex growing more rapidly than the subcortex, tangential growth has been suggested as a more plausible model.

Creases on the brain's surface are formed as a result of instability, and tangential growth models reach levels of instability that cause creasing more frequently than isotropic models. This level is called a critical point, at which, the models prefer to release potential energy by destabilizing and forming creases to become more stable.

== Genetic factors ==
The pattern of cortical gyri and sulci is not random; most of the major convolutions are conserved between individuals and are also found across species. This reproducibility may suggest that genetic mechanisms can specify the location of major gyri. Studies of monozygotic and dizygotic twins of the late 1990s support this idea, particularly with regards to primary gyri and sulci, whereas there is more variability among secondary and tertiary gyri. Therefore, one may hypothesize that secondary and tertiary folds could be more sensitive to genetic and environmental factors. The first gene reported to influence gyrification was Trnp1. Local expression levels of Trnp1, can determine the future position of developing folds/gyri in human brains. Genes that influence cortical progenitor dynamics, neurogenesis and neuronal migration, as well as genes that influence the development of cortical circuits and axonal projections may all contribute to gyrification. Trnp1 is a DNA-binding factor that has been shown to regulate other genes that regulate the proliferation of cortical progenitor cells – thereby serving as a master gene-regulator. In addition, the fibroblast growth factor (FGF)- and sonic hedgehog (SHH)-signaling pathways have recently been reported to be able to induce cortical folds, with a full complement of cortical layers, in mice that live to adulthood. These FGF and Shh factors regulate cortical stem cell proliferation and neurogenesis dynamics. Roles for beta-catenin (part of the Wnt pathway) and appropriate levels of cell death of cortical progenitors have also been found.

== Cell biological determinants ==
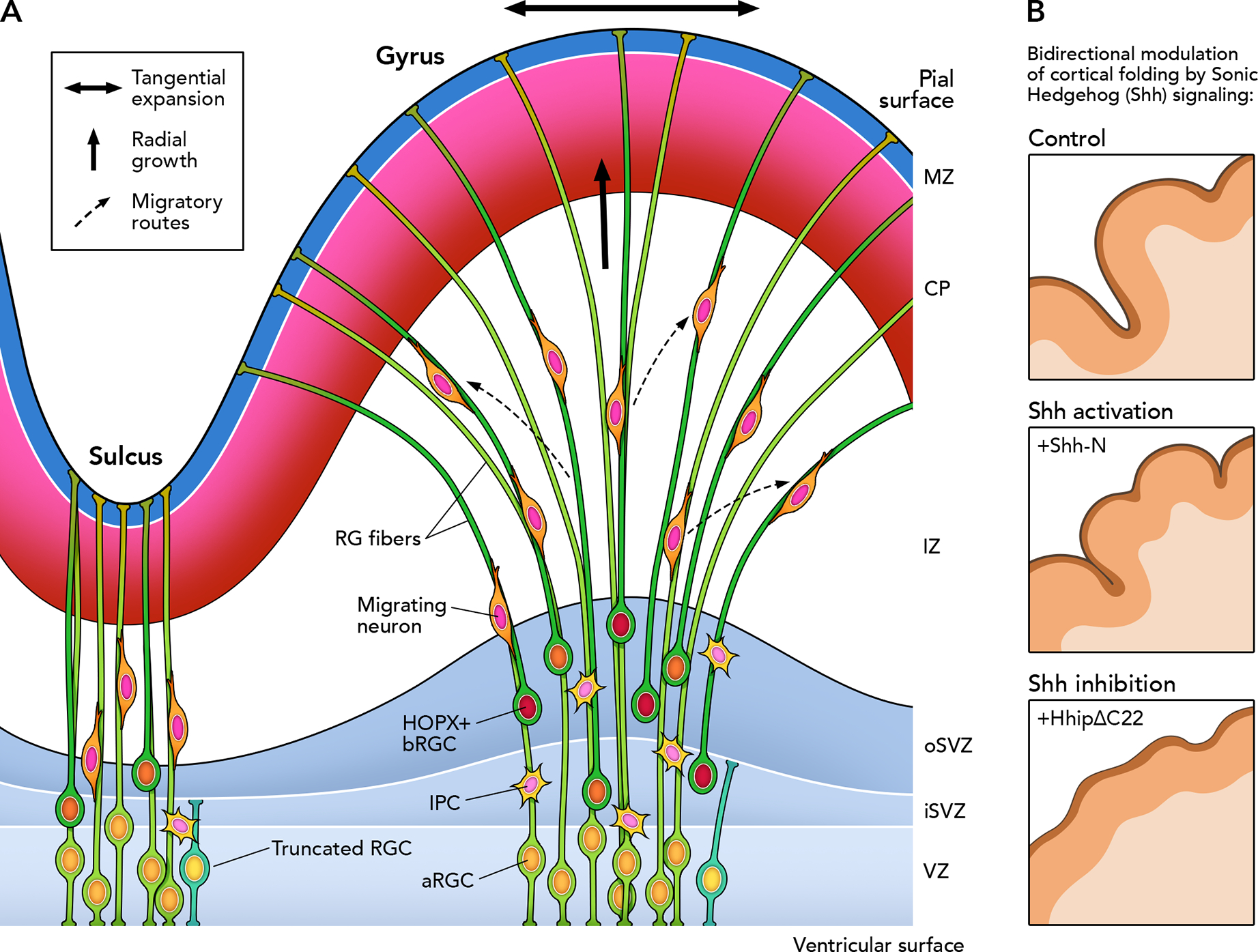
Cell mechanisms of radial glial cells, and Sonic hedgehog protein signalling promote cortical folding

Cortical stem cells, known as radial glial cells (RGC)s, reside in the ventricular zone and generate the excitatory glutamatergic neurons of the cerebral cortex. These cells rapidly proliferate through self-renewal at early developmental stages, expanding the progenitor pool and increasing cortical surface area. At this stage, the pattern of cortical areas is genetically programmed by a system of signaling centers through the process of cortical patterning, and the primordial map of cortical functional areas at this stage is called a 'protomap'. Cortical neurogenesis begins to deplete the pool of progenitor cells, subject to the influences of many genetic cues such as fibroblast growth factors (FGF)s and Notch. RGCs generate intermediate neuronal precursors that divide further in the subventricular zone (SVZ), amplifying the number of cortical neurons being produced. The long fibers of RGCs project all the way through the developing cortex to the pial surface of the brain, and these fibers serve as physical guides for neuronal migration. A second class of RGC, termed basal RGCs (bRGC)s, forms a third progenitor pool in the outer SVZ. Basal RGCs are generally much more abundant in higher mammals. Both classic RGCs and the recently described bRGCs represent guiding cues that lead newborn neurons to their destination in the cortex. Increased numbers of bRGCs increase the density of guiding fibers in an otherwise fanning out array which would lose fiber density. The scientific literature points to differences in the dynamics of proliferation and neuronal differentiation in each of these progenitor zones across mammalian species, and such differences may account for the large differences in cortical size and gyrification among mammals. One hypothesis suggests that certain progenitor cells generate abundant neurons destined for the outer cortical layers, causing greater surface area increase in the outer layers compared with the inner cortical layers. It remains unclear how this may work without further mechanistic elements.

== Variation across species ==
A gyrification index (GI) is a measure of the magnitude of cortical convolutions on the surface of the mammalian brain. Reptile's and bird's brains do not show gyrification. Mammals with a high GI are generally larger than those with a low GI; for example the pilot whale and bottlenose dolphin show the highest GI values. The human brain, while slightly higher than that of a horse, shows a similar GI. Rodents generally show the lowest GIs. Nonetheless, some larger rodents show gyrencephaly, and the marmoset, a primate, is nearly lissencephalic.

A linear relation between mammals expressed in gyrification terms has been found in a study that suggested a model combining morphometric measurements of thickness, area exposed, and total area that could be used to describe gyrification.

== Neurological disorders ==
=== Lissencephaly ===
A cerebral cortex lacking surface convolutions is said to be lissencephalic, meaning 'smooth-brained'. During embryonic development, all mammalian brains begin as lissencephalic structures derived from the neural tube. Some, like mouse brains, remain lissencephalic throughout adulthood. It has been shown that lissencephalic species possess many of the molecular cues needed to achieve gyrencephaly, but a large variety of genes are involved in the regulation of the neural progenitor proliferation and neurogenic processes that underlie gyrification. It is hypothesized that spatiotemporal differences in these molecular pathways, including FGF, Shh, and Trnp1 and likely many others, determine the timing and extent of gyrification in various species.

Lissencephaly is a human disease state. For humans with lissencephaly, a large number of neurons fail to reach the outer cortex during neuronal migration, and remain under the cortical plate. This displacement results in not only defects in cortical connections, but also a thickened cortex, consistent with the idea that a brain with a thicker cortex will have a lesser degree of gyrification.

=== Polymicrogyria ===
Polymicrogyria is a condition in which the brain has an overly convoluted cortex. Though at the surface, the brain appears smooth with a few sulci, looking at the interior of the brain reveals a convoluted structure with a large number of secondary and tertiary folds. Brain imaging with MRI reveals a brain with polymicrogyria to have a thin cortex, consistent with the idea that a brain with a thin cortex will have a high level of gyrification. A wide array of genes when mutated have been shown to cause Polymicrogyria in humans, ranging from mTORopathies (e.g. AKT3) to channelopathies (sodium channels, "SCN3A").

=== Autism ===
Patients with autism have overall higher levels of cortical gyrification, but only in the temporal, parietal, and occipital lobes, as well as part of the cingulate cortex. The higher levels of gyrification are found to relate to greater local connectivity in autistic brains, suggesting hyperconnectivity.

Trnp1, which was able to induce gyrification in animal models, has been hypothesized to be associated with disorders of gyrification in some cases of autism, but a review in 2012 found only one reported case of a mutation, in a patient with Rett syndrome (not ASD).

The folds of autistic human brains are found to experience slight shifts in location, early in brain development. Specifically, different patterns appear in the superior frontal sulcus, Sylvian fissure, inferior frontal gyrus, superior temporal gyrus, and olfactory sulci. These areas relate to working memory, emotional processing, language, and eye gaze, and their difference in location and level of gyrification when compared to a non-autistic human brain could explain some altered behaviors in autistic patients.

=== Schizophrenia ===
A more prevalent condition, schizophrenia, has also been associated with structural abnormalities in the brain. A reduced cortical thickness and increased gyrification is seen similar to the changes shown in those with autism.

=== Zika virus malformations ===
Cortical malformations induced by the Zika virus are due to infection during pregnancy, and are generally classified as microcephaly, or 'small-brain'. Due to the large reduction in volume of the cerebral cortex in microcephaly, changes in gyrification are not unexpected. Studies of the mechanism of Zika malformations indicate that the principal defect is due to infection of radial glial cells and subsequent cell death. Death of cortical stem cells causes the loss of all expected daughter cells, and the scope of the malformation thus depends on the timing of infection as well as its severity during the schedule of neural stem cell proliferation and neurogenesis. Earlier infections would generally be expected to produce a more severe malformation. The microcephaly and gyrification malformations are permanent and there are no known treatments.

== Measurements of gyrification ==
Cortical gyrification can be measured in terms of the Gyrification Index (GI), fractal dimensionality and a combination of terms such as area, thickness, and volume. The GI is defined as the ratio between the total area, and the exposed area ("perimeter of the brain delineated on two-dimensional coronal sections".) FreeSurfer, a surface reconstruction Software is one of the tools available to measure the GI.

== Additional images ==
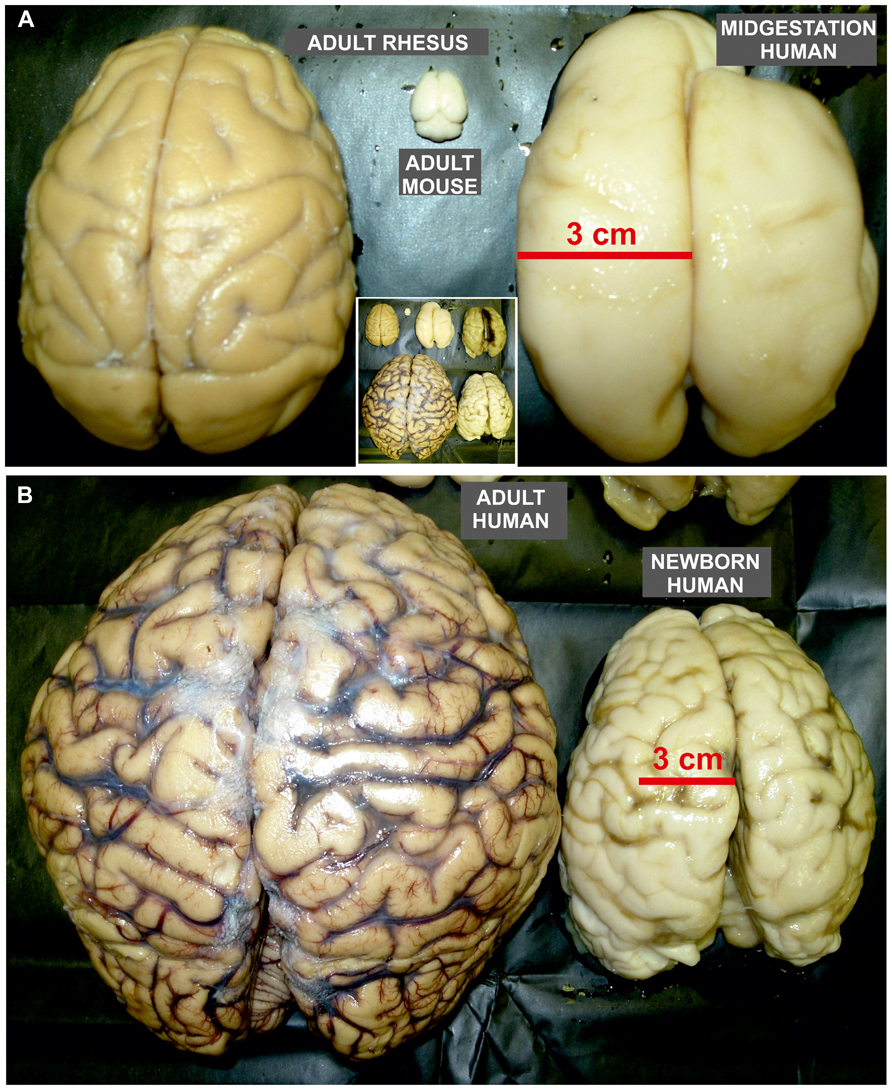
Various brains. Clockwise from top left: Adult rhesus; Adult mouse; Midgestation human; Newborn human; Adult human.

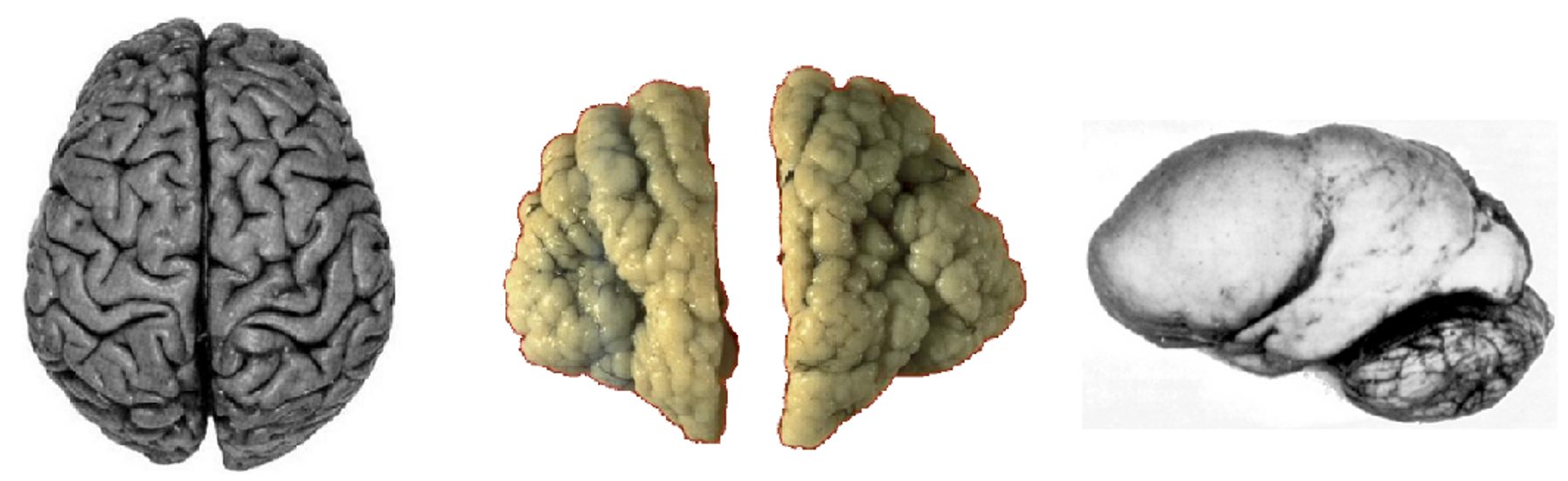
Normal human adult cerebrum (gyrencephaly)(left), polymicrogyria (center) and lissencephaly (right).

== See also ==
- Ulegyria
