= Palifermin =

Pharmaceutical drug

Clinical data
- AHFS/Drugs.com: Monograph
- MedlinePlus: a605017
- Routes of administration: intravenous bolus injection
- ATC code: V03AF08 (WHO)

Identifiers
- CAS Number: 162394-19-6
- IUPHAR/BPS: 6954
- DrugBank: DB00039
- ChemSpider: none
- UNII: QMS40680K6
- ChEMBL: ChEMBL1201821
- ECHA InfoCard: 100.118.147

Chemical and physical data
- Formula: C_{721}H_{1142}N_{202}O_{204}S_{9}
- Molar mass: 16192.82 g·mol^{−1}

Palifermin (trade name Kepivance, marketed by Biovitrum) is a truncated human recombinant keratinocyte growth factor (KGF) produced in Escherichia coli. KGF stimulates the growth of cells that line the surface of the mouth and intestinal tract.

== Therapeutic use(s) ==
When patients with blood cancers (leukemia and lymphoma) receive high dose chemotherapy and radiation therapy to undergo bone marrow transplantation, they usually get severe oral mucositis. Palifermin reduces the incidence and duration of severe oral mucositis by protecting those cells and stimulating the growth of new epithelial cells to build up the mucosal barrier.

Palifermin is also being studied in the prevention and treatment of oral mucositis and dysphagia (difficulty swallowing) in other types of cancer.

== Drug target and mechanism of action ==
Keratinocyte growth factor (KGF) resides in the family of fibroblast growth factor (FGF). The drug's target is the KGF receptor. Through the binding of this drug to the aforementioned receptor, Palifermin stimulates epithelial cell proliferation, differentiation, and upregulation of cytoprotective mechanisms to reduce the symptoms of oral mucositis.

== Side effects ==
Common side effects often seen in conjunction with the use of Palifermin include, but are not limited to:

- Swelling
- Pain (including joint pain)
- Increase in blood pancreas enzymes
- Increased blood pressure
- Proteinuria

Some of the more serious side effects can be seen below:

- Difficulty breathing
- Changes in cutaneous or mucous membrane appearance/feel (redness/rash, swelling, itching, change in color or thickness of tongue, changes in taste)
- Fever

== Administration ==
Palifermin is administered via intravenous bolus injection. The drug comes as a lyophilized powder that must be reconstituted with sterile water for injection before it may be administered. It is given for three days before, and three days after chemotherapy is undergone. However, it is important that the drug is not administered within 24 hours of the actual chemotherapy process. This drug is most commonly dosed in a hospital setting, but can be taken at home as per specific instructions regarding preparation and storage from a doctor. The recommended dosage consists of 60 μg/kg/day.

== Drug interactions ==
Co-administration of Palifermin with Heparin should be avoided. Drug interactions with Heparin include a significantly increased systemic exposure to Palifermin. Avoid administration of Palifermin within 24 hours of myelotoxic chemotherapy, as this could result in increased oral mucositis.

== Pre-clinical trials ==
=== Toxicology studies ===
Toxicology studies were conducted by use of animal models, utilizing a variety of species, including mice, rats, and monkeys. Singles doses in rats and monkeys were given up to 30,000 and 50,000 micrograms/kg, respectively. Daily doses of 1,000 and 300 micrograms/kg, respectively, were given to rats and monkeys for 28 consecutive days. Toxic effects noted included exaggerated pharmacological effects of the drug, such as hyperkeratosis of skin and tongue and goblet cell hyperplasia in the GI tract. It was noted that the rats were more sensitive to these effects than the monkeys. Induced genetic abnormality assays including microchromosome reverse mutation and E. coli mutagenicity assays were completed using mice. There were no genotoxic effects noted from this study.

== Clinical trials ==
=== Phase I ===
- Study 950170: The first in human study included administration via the subcutaneous route. This study was ended early due to the large number of adverse reactions observed around/in the injection site.
- Study 960136: (Dose-escalation). Intended to determine safety and tolerability, biologic activity, and pharmacokinetic profile in 61 healthy volunteers. The study included a single dose as well as a combination of 3 daily doses (ranging from 0.2 to 20 micrograms/kg) given consecutively. It was determined that single doses did not result in noteworthy production of epithelial cells.
- Study 970136 (Randomized, double-blind, placebo-controlled, dose-escalation). Intended to determine the safety and tolerability, and pharmacokinetics of a single dose, administered intravenously (ranging from 5–20 micrograms/kg) in 24 healthy volunteers. It was found that systematic exposure was proportional to the administered dose. Extravascular distribution of the drug was noted.
- Study 970290 (Open-label). Intended to evaluate pharmacokinetic properties intersubject variability of the drug in four, healthy male volunteers. It was determined that a high intersubject variability was not the cause of dosing errors in previous studies.
- Study 970276 (Dose-escalation). Intended to determine the safety and tolerability, pharmacokinetic and pharmacodynamics properties of the drug versus a placebo in 18 healthy volunteers. The study consisted of daily IV doses in three consecutive days (20 or 40 micrograms/kg). It was determined that subjects that received three daily doses of 40 micrograms/kg demonstrated adequate production of epithelial cells in the buccal mucosa. Predicted elevation in amylase and lipase were also determined.
- Study 20010192 (Randomized, double-blind, placebo-controlled, dose-escalation). Intended to determine safety and tolerability, pharmacokinetic and pharmacodynamics properties of the drug versus a placebo by utilization of a single IV dose (ranging from 60 to 250 micrograms/kg) in 84 healthy volunteers. It was determined that after the first 30 minutes (after IV dose was administered) a rapid decline in concentration occurred, followed by a subsequent plateau once 1.5 hours had been achieved. A decline in concentration was consistently observed once six hours post-dose had been reached. It was also noted that with a four-fold increase in dose, a three-fold increase in AUC was achieved. Half-life values of 4–6 hours were noted; extravascular distribution of the drug was noted as well.

=== Phase II ===
- Study 980231 (Randomized, double-blind, placebo-controlled). Three dose regimens were included: "pre-post", "pre", and placebo Palifermin administration (60 micrograms/kg) by IV for three consecutive days before chemotherapy and after autologous peripheral blood progenitor cell (PBPC). Efficacy was demonstrated in the drug versus the placebo.

=== Phase III ===
- Study 2000162 (Randomized, double-blind, placebo-controlled). Intended to evaluate Palifermin efficacy in reducing oral mucositis in subjects with hematologic malignancy undergoing chemotherapy with autologous peripheral blood progenitor cell transplantation. Patients were administered with 3 daily, consecutive IV doses (or placebo) of Palifermin (60 micrograms/kg) before chemotherapy and Filgrastim (60 micrograms/kg) was administered after transplantation for three days consecutively. Efficacy was demonstrated in the drug versus the placebo.

== Costs ==
Palifermin costs approximately 5,000 euros per treatment for a 70 kg patient.

=== Annual sales ===
The worldwide profits for years the 2008–2011 are provided below.

- 2008: $5.7 million
- 2009: $109.9 million
- 2010: $94.8 million
- 2011: $77.9 million
