= TRNP1 =

Protein-coding gene in humans

Identifiers
- Aliases: TRNP1, C1orf225, TNRP, TMF1-regulated nuclear protein 1, TRNP, TMF1 regulated nuclear protein 1
- External IDs: OMIM: 616824; MGI: 1916789; GeneCards: TRNP1

Gene location (Human)
| Chr. | Chromosome 1 (human) |
| Band | 1p36.11 | Start | 26,993,692 bp |
| Band | 1p36.11 | End | 27,000,886 bp |

Gene location (Mouse)
| Chr. | Chromosome 4 (mouse) |
| Band | 4|4 D2.3 | Start | 133,218,411 bp |
| Band | 4|4 D2.3 | End | 133,225,861 bp |
RNA expression pattern
| Bgee | Human / Mouse (ortholog); Top expressed in: cardiac muscle tissue of right atrium; lateral nuclear group of thalamus; mucosa of pharynx; mucosa of esophagus; myocardium of left ventricle; nasal epithelium; pancreatic epithelial cell; body of stomach; pylorus; palpebral conjunctiva / Top expressed in: medial dorsal nucleus; olfactory system; olfactory epithelium; medial geniculate nucleus; neural layer of retina; lateral geniculate nucleus; facial motor nucleus; pontine nuclei; deep cerebellar nuclei; visual cortex; More reference expression data |
| BioGPS | n/a |
Gene ontology
| Molecular function | DNA binding |
| Cellular component | nucleus |
| Biological process | multicellular organism development; cell cycle; regulation of transcription, DNA-templated; regulation of cell population proliferation; transcription, DNA-templated; cerebellar cortex morphogenesis; neural precursor cell proliferation; regulation of cell cycle; nervous system development |
Sources:Amigo / QuickGO
Orthologs
| Databases | NCBI: entry; OMA: entry |
| Species | Human | Mouse |
| Entrez | 388610 | 69539 |
| Ensembl | ENSG00000253368 | ENSMUSG00000056596 |
| UniProt | Q6NT89 | Q80ZI1 |
| RefSeq (mRNA) | NM_001013642 | NM_001081156 |
| RefSeq (protein) | NP_001013664 | NP_001074625 |
| Location (UCSC) | Chr 1: 26.99 – 27 Mb | Chr 4: 133.22 – 133.23 Mb |
| PubMed search |
- Wikidata
| View/Edit Human | View/Edit Mouse |

TMF-regulated nuclear protein 1 is a nuclear protein that in humans is encoded by the TRNP1 gene. TRNP1 plays a crucial role in cellular proliferation and brain development. Trnp1 is the first protein that has been shown to play a major role in cortical folding. It represents a major stem cell factor, that is involved in crucial processes during brain but also stem cell development. Trnp1 controls gene expression levels and is sufficient to induce gyri and sulci in the developing brain. Local differences of Trnp1 expression levels in the human brain correlate with cortical folding.

== Function ==
Trnp1 binds to DNA with high affinity. Its direct molecular function is unknown, it has no known molecular motif and therefore may represent a new class of molecules.

Trnp1 has a very strong effect on cellular proliferation, Trnp1 dramatically increases the proliferation rate in vitro and in vivo.

In addition to its stem cell function during brain development, there are data suggesting that Trnp1 might play a crucial role in cancer cells—Trnp1 has been described in gene expression analysis in cancer types. the very strong proliferation capacity may be responsible for its oncogenic potential. Specifically, Trnp1 (together with other factors) serves as a biomarker for specific colon cancer subtypes.
