= Fibroblast growth factor 1 =

Protein-coding gene in the species Homo sapiens

FGF1
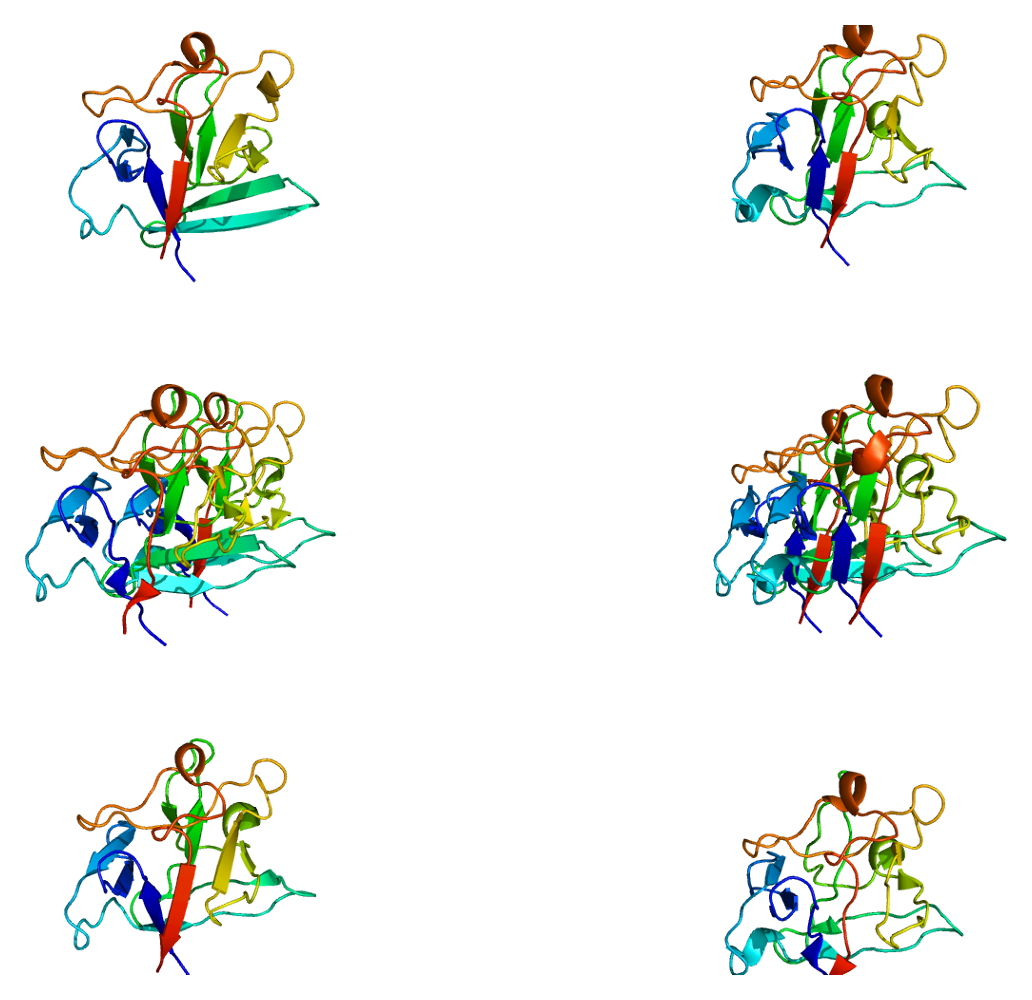

Identifiers
- Aliases: FGF1, AFGF, ECGF, ECGF-beta, ECGFA, ECGFB, FGF-1, FGF-alpha, FGFA, GLIO703, HBGF-1, HBGF1, fibroblast growth factor 1
- External IDs: OMIM: 131220; MGI: 95515; GeneCards: FGF1
Available structures
PDB	Ortholog search: PDBe RCSB
PDB	List of PDB id codes 4QO3, 1AXM, 1DJS, 1DZC, 1DZD, 1E0O, 1EVT, 1HKN, 1JQZ, 1JT3, 1JT4, 1JT5, 1JT7, 1JTC, 1JY0, 1K5U, 1K5V, 1M16, 1NZK, 1P63, 1PZZ, 1Q03, 1Q04, 1RG8, 1RML, 1RY7, 1YTO, 1Z2V, 1Z4S, 2AFG, 2AQZ, 2AXM, 2ERM, 2HW9, 2HWA, 2HWM, 2HZ9, 2K43, 2K4A, 2K8R, 2KI4, 2KI6, 2NTD, 2Q9X, 2RQ9, 3B9U, 3BA4, 3BA5, 3BA7, 3BAD, 3BAG, 3BAH, 3BAO, 3BAQ, 3BAU, 3BAV, 3BB2, 3CQA, 3CRG, 3CRH, 3CRI, 3CU1, 3FGM, 3FJ8, 3FJ9, 3FJA, 3FJB, 3FJC, 3FJD, 3FJE, 3FJF, 3FJH, 3FJI, 3FJJ, 3FJK, 3HOM, 3JUT, 3K1X, 3O3Q, 3OJ2, 3OJM, 3OJV, 3UD7, 3UD8, 3UD9, 3UDA, 4J23, 4Q91, 4Q9G, 4Q9P, 4QAL, 4QBC, 4QBV, 4QC4, 4XKI, 4YOL

Gene location (Human)
Chr.	Chromosome 5 (human)
Band	5q31.3	Start	142,592,178 bp
Band	5q31.3	End	142,698,070 bp

Gene location (Mouse)
Chr.	Chromosome 18 (mouse)
Band	18 B3|18 20.74 cM	Start	38,971,726 bp
Band	18 B3|18 20.74 cM	End	39,062,525 bp
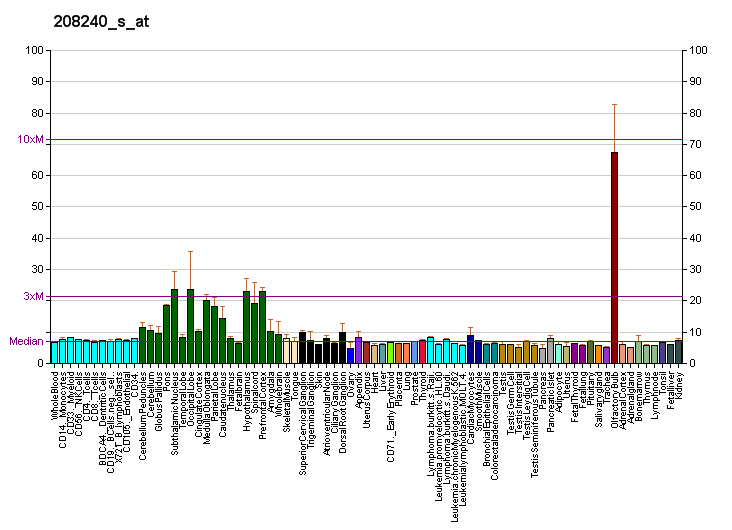

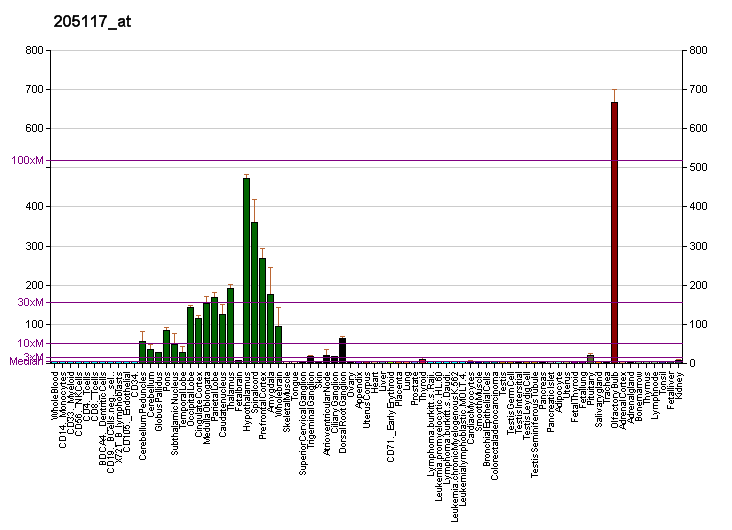
RNA expression pattern
Bgee	Human / Mouse (ortholog); Top expressed in: glomerulus; metanephric glomerulus; inferior ganglion of vagus nerve; corpus callosum; optic nerve; external globus pallidus; internal globus pallidus; medulla oblongata; inferior olivary nucleus; olfactory bulb / Top expressed in: deep cerebellar nuclei; pontine nuclei; medial vestibular nucleus; habenula; facial motor nucleus; dorsal tegmental nucleus; anterior horn of spinal cord; right lung; myocardium of ventricle; right ventricle; More reference expression data
BioGPS	More reference expression data
Gene ontology
Molecular function	S100 protein binding; protein binding; growth factor activity; protein tyrosine kinase activity; phosphatidylinositol-4,5-bisphosphate 3-kinase activity; fibroblast growth factor receptor binding; integrin binding; 1-phosphatidylinositol-3-kinase activity; heparin binding; Hsp70 protein binding
Cellular component	cytoplasm; cytosol; extracellular region; cell cortex; nucleolus; nucleus; extracellular space; extracellular matrix
Biological process	cell differentiation; cellular response to heat; positive regulation of protein phosphorylation; positive regulation of MAP kinase activity; organ induction; lung development; positive regulation of epithelial cell proliferation; anatomical structure morphogenesis; positive regulation of intracellular signal transduction; branch elongation involved in ureteric bud branching; positive regulation of angiogenesis; MAPK cascade; multicellular organism development; mesonephric epithelium development; angiogenesis; regulation of endothelial cell chemotaxis to fibroblast growth factor; positive regulation of cholesterol biosynthetic process; cell population proliferation; positive regulation of cell division; positive regulation of transcription by RNA polymerase II; signal transduction; phosphatidylinositol phosphate biosynthetic process; peptidyl-tyrosine phosphorylation; positive regulation of sprouting angiogenesis; fibroblast growth factor receptor signaling pathway; positive regulation of cell population proliferation; phosphatidylinositol-3-phosphate biosynthetic process; regulation of endothelial tube morphogenesis; positive regulation of cell migration; positive regulation of endothelial cell migration; activation of protein kinase B activity; regulation of signaling receptor activity; positive regulation of protein kinase B signaling
Sources:Amigo / QuickGO
Orthologs
Databases	NCBI: entry; OMA: entry
Species	Human	Mouse
Entrez	2246	14164
Ensembl	ENSG00000113578	ENSMUSG00000036585
UniProt	P05230	P61148
RefSeq (mRNA)	NM_000800; NM_001144892; NM_001144934; NM_001144935; NM_001257205 NM_001257206; NM_001257207; NM_001257208; NM_001257209; NM_001257210; NM_001257211; NM_001257212; NM_033136; NM_033137; NM_001354955; NM_001354956; NM_001354957; NM_001354958; NM_001354959; NM_001354961; NM_001354963; NM_001354964; NM_001354951; NM_001354952; NM_001354953; NM_001354954; NM_001354962	NM_010197
RefSeq (protein)	NP_000791; NP_001138364; NP_001138406; NP_001138407; NP_001244134 NP_001244135; NP_001244136; NP_001244137; NP_001244138; NP_001244139; NP_001244140; NP_001244141; NP_149127; NP_149128; NP_001341884; NP_001341885; NP_001341886; NP_001341887; NP_001341888; NP_001341890; NP_001341892; NP_001341893; NP_001341880; NP_001341881; NP_001341882; NP_001341883; NP_001341891	NP_034327
Location (UCSC)	Chr 5: 142.59 – 142.7 Mb	Chr 18: 38.97 – 39.06 Mb
PubMed search
- Wikidata
View/Edit Human	View/Edit Mouse

Fibroblast growth factor 1 (FGF-1) also known as acidic fibroblast growth factor (aFGF), is a growth factor and signaling protein encoded by the FGF1 gene. It is synthesized as a 155 amino acid polypeptide, whose mature form is a non-glycosylated 17-18 kDa protein. Fibroblast growth factor protein was first purified in 1975, but soon afterwards others using different conditions isolated acidic FGF, Heparin-binding growth factor-1, and Endothelial cell growth factor-1. Gene sequencing revealed that this group was actually the same growth factor and that FGF1 was a member of a family of FGF proteins.

FGF-1 has no definitive signal sequence and thus is not secreted through classical pathways, but it does appear to form a disulfide linked dimer inside cells that associate with a complex of proteins at the cell membrane (including S100A13 and Syt1) which then help flip it through the membrane to the exterior of the cell. Once in the reducing conditions of the surrounding tissue, the dimer dissociates into monomeric FGF1 that can enter systemic circulation or be sequestered in tissues binding to heparan sulfate proteoglycans of the extracellular matrix. FGF1 can then bind to and exert its effects via specific fibroblast growth factor receptor (FGFR) proteins which themselves constitute a family of closely related molecules.

In addition to its extracellular activity, FGF1 can also function intracellularly. The protein has a nuclear localization sequence (NLS) but the route that FGF1 takes to get to the nucleus is unclear and it appears that some sort of cell surface receptor binding is necessary, followed by its internalization and translocation to the nucleus whereupon it can interact with nuclear isoforms of FGFRs. This is different from FGF2 which also can activate nuclear FGFRs but has splicing variants of the protein that never leave the cell and go directly to the nucleus.

== Function ==
FGF family members possess broad mitogenic and cell survival activities, and are involved in a variety of biological processes, including embryonic development, cell growth, morphogenesis, tissue repair, tumor growth and invasion. This protein functions as a modifier of endothelial cell migration and proliferation, as well as an angiogenic factor. It acts as a mitogen for a variety of mesoderm- and neuroectoderm-derived cells in vitro, thus is thought to be involved in organogenesis. Three alternatively spliced variants encoding different isoforms have been described.

FGF1 is multifunctional with many reported effects. For one example, in mice with diet-induced diabetes that is an experimental equivalent of type 2 diabetes in humans, a single injection of the FGF1 protein is enough to restore blood sugar levels to a healthy range for > 2 days.

== Interactions ==
FGF1 has been shown to interact with:

- CSNK2A2
- CSNK2B
- CSNK2A1
- FIBP
- FGFR1
- FGFR2
- FGFR3
- FGFR4
- HSPA9 and
- S100A13
- Synaptotagmin 1 (SYT1)

== See also ==
- Fibroblast growth factor
