= FGF6 =

Protein-coding gene in humans

Identifiers
- Aliases: FGF6, HBGF-6, HST2, fibroblast growth factor 6
- External IDs: OMIM: 134921; MGI: 95520; GeneCards: FGF6

Gene location (Human)
Chr.	Chromosome 12 (human)
Band	12p13.32	Start	4,428,155 bp
Band	12p13.32	End	4,445,815 bp

Gene location (Mouse)
Chr.	Chromosome 6 (mouse)
Band	6 F3|6 61.92 cM	Start	126,992,549 bp
Band	6 F3|6 61.92 cM	End	127,005,150 bp
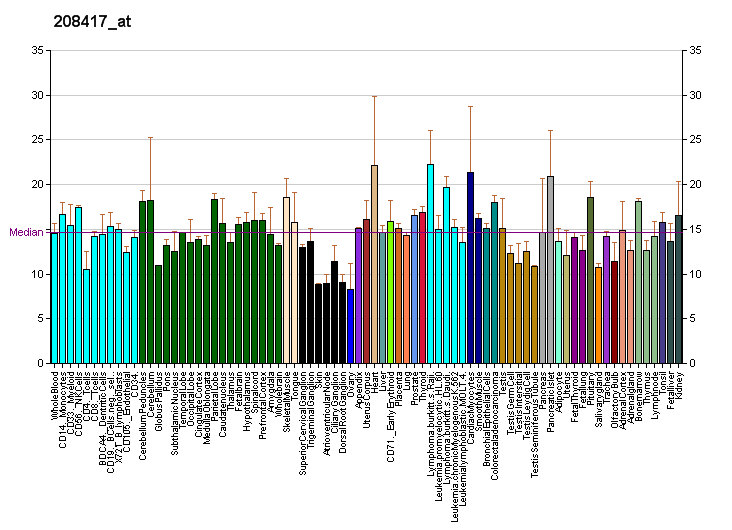
RNA expression pattern
Bgee	Human / Mouse (ortholog); Top expressed in: muscle of thigh; gastrocnemius muscle; skeletal muscle tissue; oocyte; external globus pallidus; pars compacta; secondary oocyte; superior frontal gyrus; duodenum; urinary bladder / Top expressed in: triceps brachii muscle; myotome; ankle; temporal muscle; elbow; tongue muscle; soleus muscle; tibialis anterior muscle; sternocleidomastoid muscle; embryo; More reference expression data
BioGPS	More reference expression data
Gene ontology
Molecular function	fibroblast growth factor receptor binding; growth factor activity; protein tyrosine kinase activity; phosphatidylinositol-4,5-bisphosphate 3-kinase activity; 1-phosphatidylinositol-3-kinase activity
Cellular component	extracellular region; sarcolemma; intracellular anatomical structure; extracellular space
Biological process	cell differentiation; cell-cell signaling; MAPK cascade; multicellular organism development; fibroblast growth factor receptor signaling pathway; angiogenesis; positive regulation of cell population proliferation; cell population proliferation; myoblast differentiation; positive regulation of cell division; cartilage condensation; signal transduction; phosphatidylinositol phosphate biosynthetic process; peptidyl-tyrosine phosphorylation; phosphatidylinositol-3-phosphate biosynthetic process; regulation of signaling receptor activity; positive regulation of protein kinase B signaling
Sources:Amigo / QuickGO
Orthologs
Databases	NCBI: entry; OMA: entry
Species	Human	Mouse
Entrez	2251	14177
Ensembl	ENSG00000111241	ENSMUSG00000000183
UniProt	P10767	P21658
RefSeq (mRNA)	NM_020996	NM_010204
RefSeq (protein)	NP_066276	NP_034334
Location (UCSC)	Chr 12: 4.43 – 4.45 Mb	Chr 6: 126.99 – 127.01 Mb
PubMed search
- Wikidata
View/Edit Human	View/Edit Mouse

Fibroblast growth factor 6 is a protein that in humans is encoded by the FGF6 gene.

The protein encoded by this gene is a member of the fibroblast growth factor (FGF) family. FGF family members possess broad mitogenic and cell survival activities, and are involved in a variety of biological processes, including embryonic development, cell growth, morphogenesis, tissue repair, tumor growth and invasion. This gene displayed oncogenic transforming activity when transfected into mammalian cells. The mouse homolog of this gene exhibits a restricted expression profile predominantly in the myogenic lineage, which suggested a role in muscle regeneration or differentiation.
