= Fibroblast growth factor =

Family of proteins involved in anatomical development

Fibroblast growth factors (FGF) are a family of cell signalling proteins produced by the macrophages. They are involved in a wide variety of processes, most notably as crucial elements for normal development in animal cells. Any irregularities in their function will lead to a range of developmental defects. These growth factors typically act as a systemic or locally circulating molecules of extracellular origin that activate cell surface receptors. A defining property of FGFs is that they bind to heparin and to heparan sulfate. Thus, some are sequestered in the extracellular matrix of tissues that contains heparan sulfate proteoglycans, and released locally upon injury or tissue remodeling.

== Families ==
In humans, 23 members of the FGF family have been identified, all of which are structurally related signaling molecules:

- Members FGF1 through FGF10 all bind fibroblast growth factor receptors (FGFRs). FGF1 is also known as acidic fibroblast growth factor, and FGF2 is also known as basic fibroblast growth factor.
- Members FGF11, FGF12, FGF13, and FGF14, also known as FGF homologous factors 1-4 (FHF1-FHF4), have been shown to have distinct functions compared to the FGFs. Although these factors possess remarkably similar sequence homology, they do not bind FGFRs and are involved in intracellular processes unrelated to the FGFs. This group is also known as the intracellular fibroblast growth factor subfamily (iFGF).
- Human FGF18 is involved in cell development and morphogenesis in various tissues including cartilage.
- Human FGF20 was identified based on its homology to Xenopus FGF-20 (XFGF-20).
- FGF15 through FGF23 were described later and functions are still being characterized. FGF15 is the mouse ortholog of human FGF19 (there is no human FGF15) and, where their functions are shared, they are often described as FGF15/19. In contrast to the local activity of the other FGFs, FGF15/19, FGF21 and FGF23 have hormonal systemic effects.

== Receptors ==
The mammalian fibroblast growth factor receptor family has 4 members, FGFR1, FGFR2, FGFR3, and FGFR4. The FGFRs consist of three extracellular immunoglobulin-type domains (D1-D3), a single-span trans-membrane domain and an intracellular split tyrosine kinase domain. FGFs interact with the D2 and D3 domains, with the D3 interactions primarily responsible for ligand-binding specificity (see below). Heparan sulfate binding is mediated through the D3 domain. A short stretch of acidic amino acids located between the D1 and D2 domains has auto-inhibitory functions. This 'acid box' motif interacts with the heparan sulfate binding site to prevent receptor activation in the absence of FGFs.

Alternate mRNA splicing gives rise to 'b' and 'c' variants of FGFRs 1, 2 and 3. Through this mechanism, seven different signalling FGFR sub-types can be expressed at the cell surface. Each FGFR binds to a specific subset of the FGFs. Similarly, most FGFs can bind to several different FGFR subtypes. FGF1 is sometimes referred to as the 'universal ligand' as it is capable of activating all 7 different FGFRs. In contrast, FGF7 (keratinocyte growth factor, KGF) binds only to FGFR2b (KGFR).

The signalling complex at the cell surface is believed to be a ternary complex formed between two identical FGF ligands, two identical FGFR subunits, and either one or two heparan sulfate chains.

== History ==
A mitogenic growth factor activity was found in pituitary extracts by Armelin in 1973 and further work by Gospodarowicz as reported in 1974 described a more defined isolation of proteins from cow brain extract which, when tested in a bioassay that caused fibroblasts to proliferate, led these investigators to apply the name "fibroblast growth factor." In 1975, they further fractionated the extract using acidic and basic pH and isolated two slightly different forms that were named "acidic fibroblast growth factor" (FGF1) and "basic fibroblast growth factor" (FGF2). These proteins had a high degree of sequence homology among their amino acid chains, but were determined to be distinct proteins.

Not long after FGF1 and FGF2 were isolated, another group of investigators isolated a pair of heparin-binding growth factors that they named HBGF-1 and HBGF-2, while a third group isolated a pair of growth factors that caused proliferation of cells in a bioassay containing blood vessel endothelium cells, which they called ECGF1 and ECGF2. These independently discovered proteins were eventually demonstrated to be the same sets of molecules, namely FGF1, HBGF-1 and ECGF-1 were all the same acidic fibroblast growth factor described by Gospodarowicz, et al., while FGF2, HBGF-2, and ECGF-2 were all the same basic fibroblast growth factor.

== Functions ==
FGFs are multifunctional proteins with a wide variety of effects; they are most commonly mitogens but also have regulatory, morphological, and endocrine effects. They have been alternately referred to as "pluripotent" growth factors and as "promiscuous" growth factors due to their multiple actions on multiple cell types. Promiscuous refers to the biochemistry and pharmacology concept of how a variety of molecules can bind to and elicit a response from single receptor. In the case of FGF, four receptor subtypes can be activated by more than twenty different FGF ligands. Thus the functions of FGFs in developmental processes include mesoderm induction, anterior-posterior patterning, limb development, neural induction and neural development, and in mature tissues/systems angiogenesis, keratinocyte organization, and wound healing processes.

FGF is critical during normal development of both vertebrates and invertebrates and any irregularities in their function leads to a range of developmental defects.

FGFs secreted by hypoblasts during avian gastrulation play a role in stimulating a Wnt signaling pathway that is involved in the differential movement of Koller's sickle cells during formation of the primitive streak. Left, angiography of the newly formed vascular network in the region of the front wall of the left ventricle. Right, analysis quantifying the angiogenic effect.

While many FGFs can be secreted by cells to act on distant targets, some FGF act locally within a tissue, and even within a cell. Human FGF2 occurs in low molecular weight (LMW) and high molecular weight (HMW) isoforms. LMW FGF2 is primarily cytoplasmic and functions in an autocrine manner, whereas HMW FGF2s are nuclear and exert activities through an intracrine mechanism.

One important function of FGF1 and FGF2 is the promotion of endothelial cell proliferation and the physical organization of endothelial cells into tube-like structures. They thus promote angiogenesis, the growth of new blood vessels from the pre-existing vasculature. FGF1 and FGF2 are more potent angiogenic factors than vascular endothelial growth factor (VEGF) or platelet-derived growth factor (PDGF). FGF1 has been shown in clinical experimental studies to induce angiogenesis in the heart.

As well as stimulating blood vessel growth, FGFs are important players in wound healing. FGF1 and FGF2 stimulate angiogenesis and the proliferation of fibroblasts that give rise to granulation tissue, which fills up a wound space/cavity early in the wound-healing process. FGF7 and FGF10 (also known as keratinocyte growth factors KGF and KGF2, respectively) stimulate the repair of injured skin and mucosal tissues by stimulating the proliferation, migration and differentiation of epithelial cells, and they have direct chemotactic effects on tissue remodelling.

During the development of the central nervous system, FGFs play important roles in neural stem cell proliferation, neurogenesis, axon growth, and differentiation. FGF signaling is important in promoting surface area growth of the developing cerebral cortex by reducing neuronal differentiation and hence permitting the self-renewal of cortical progenitor cells, known as radial glial cells, and FGF2 has been used to induce artificial gyrification of the mouse brain. Another FGF family member, FGF8, regulates the size and positioning of the functional areas of the cerebral cortex (Brodmann areas).

FGFs are also important for maintenance of the adult brain. Thus, FGFs are major determinants of neuronal survival both during development and during adulthood. Adult neurogenesis within the hippocampus e.g. depends greatly on FGF2. In addition, FGF1 and FGF2 seem to be involved in the regulation of synaptic plasticity and processes attributed to learning and memory, at least in the hippocampus.

The 15 exparacrine FGFs are secreted proteins that bind heparan sulfate and can, therefore, be bound to the extracellular matrix of tissues that contain heparan sulfate proteoglycans. This local action of FGF proteins is classified as paracrine signalling, most commonly through the JAK-STAT signalling pathway or the receptor tyrosine kinase (RTK) pathway.

Members of the FGF19 subfamily (FGF15, FGF19, FGF21, and FGF23) bind less tightly to heparan sulfates, and so can act in an endocrine fashion on far-away tissues, such as intestine, liver, kidney, adipose, and bone. For example:

- FGF15 and FGF19 (FGF15/19) are produced by intestinal cells but act on FGFR4-expressing liver cells to downregulate the key gene (CYP7A1) in the bile acid synthesis pathway.
- FGF23 is produced by bone but acts on FGFR1-expressing kidney cells to regulate the synthesis of vitamin D and phosphate homeostasis.

== Structure ==
The crystal structures of FGF1 have been solved and found to be related to interleukin 1-beta. Both families have the same beta trefoil fold consisting of 12-stranded beta-sheet structure, with the beta-sheets are arranged in 3 similar lobes around a central axis, 6 strands forming an anti-parallel beta-barrel. In general, the beta-sheets are well-preserved and the crystal structures superimpose in these areas. The intervening loops are less well-conserved - the loop between beta-strands 6 and 7 is slightly longer in interleukin-1 beta.

== Clinical applications ==
Dysregulation of the FGF signalling system underlies a range of diseases associated with the increased FGF expression. Inhibitors of FGF signalling have shown clinical efficacy. Some FGF ligands (particularly FGF2) have been demonstrated to enhance tissue repair (e.g. skin burns, grafts, and ulcers) in a range of clinical settings.

== See also ==
- Receptor tyrosine kinase
- Granulocyte-colony stimulating factor (G-CSF)
- Granulocyte-macrophage colony stimulating factor (GM-CSF)
- Nerve growth factor (NGF)
- Neurotrophins
- Erythropoietin (EPO)
- Thrombopoietin (TPO)
- Myostatin (GDF8)
- Growth differentiation factor 9 (GDF9)
- Gyrification
- Neurogenesis
