= FIBP =

Protein-coding gene in the species Homo sapiens

Identifiers
- Aliases: FIBP, FGFIBP-1, FGF1 intracellular binding protein, TROFAS
- External IDs: OMIM: 608296; MGI: 1926233; GeneCards: FIBP

Gene location (Human)
Chr.	Chromosome 11 (human)
Band	11q13.1	Start	65,883,740 bp
Band	11q13.1	End	65,888,531 bp

Gene location (Mouse)
Chr.	Chromosome 19 (mouse)
Band	19|19 A	Start	5,510,643 bp
Band	19|19 A	End	5,515,079 bp
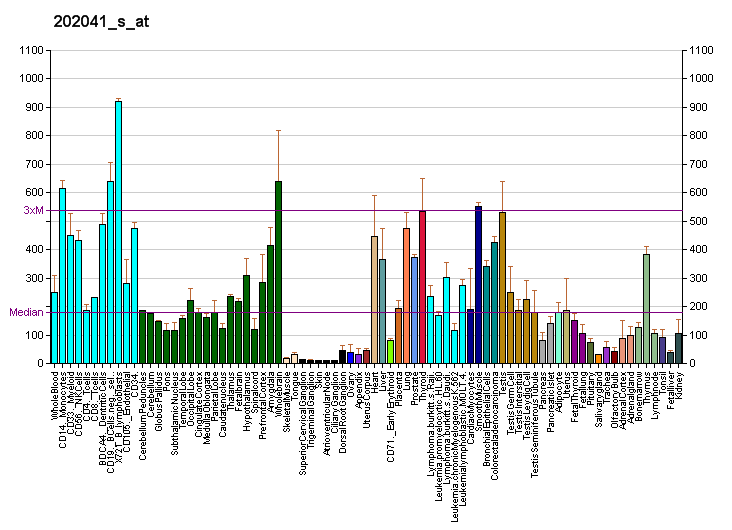
RNA expression pattern
Bgee	Human / Mouse (ortholog); Top expressed in: stromal cell of endometrium; right frontal lobe; prefrontal cortex; right hemisphere of cerebellum; apex of heart; ganglionic eminence; left testis; right testis; Brodmann area 9; cingulate gyrus / Top expressed in: lip; ventricular zone; choroid plexus of fourth ventricle; superior frontal gyrus; yolk sac; primary visual cortex; granulocyte; dentate gyrus of hippocampal formation granule cell; right kidney; neural layer of retina; More reference expression data
BioGPS	More reference expression data
Gene ontology
Molecular function	fibroblast growth factor binding
Cellular component	extracellular exosome; membrane; mitochondrion; nucleus; endomembrane system; nuclear speck
Biological process	fibroblast growth factor receptor signaling pathway; platelet aggregation
Sources:Amigo / QuickGO
Orthologs
Databases	NCBI: entry; OMA: entry
Species	Human	Mouse
Entrez	9158	58249
Ensembl	ENSG00000172500	ENSMUSG00000024911
UniProt	O43427	Q9JI19
RefSeq (mRNA)	NM_004214; NM_198897	NM_001253832; NM_021438
RefSeq (protein)	NP_004205; NP_942600	NP_001240761; NP_067413
Location (UCSC)	Chr 11: 65.88 – 65.89 Mb	Chr 19: 5.51 – 5.52 Mb
PubMed search
- Wikidata
View/Edit Human	View/Edit Mouse

Acidic fibroblast growth factor intracellular-binding protein is a protein that in humans is encoded by the FIBP gene.

== Function ==
Acidic fibroblast growth factor is mitogenic for a variety of different cell types and acts by stimulating mitogenesis or inducing morphological changes and differentiation. The FIBP protein is an intracellular protein that binds selectively to acidic fibroblast growth factor (aFGF). It is postulated that FIBP may be involved in the mitogenic action of aFGF. Two transcript variants encoding different isoforms have been found for this gene.

== Interactions ==
FIBP has been shown to interact with FGF1.
