= Fibroblast growth factor receptor =

Family of proteins that bind to fibroblast growth factors

Identifiers
- Symbol: FGFR
- InterPro: IPR016248
- Membranome: 1201
Available protein structures:
- PDB: IPR016248
- AlphaFold: IPR016248

The fibroblast growth factor receptors (FGFR) are, as their name implies, receptors that bind to members of the fibroblast growth factor (FGF) family of proteins. Some of these receptors are involved in pathological conditions. For example, a point mutation in FGFR3 can lead to achondroplasia.

== Structure ==
The fibroblast growth factor receptors consist of an extracellular ligand domain composed of three immunoglobulin-like domains, a single transmembrane helix domain, and an intracellular domain with tyrosine kinase activity. These receptors bind fibroblast growth factors, members of the largest family of growth factor ligands, comprising 22 members.

The natural alternate splicing of four fibroblast growth factor receptor (FGFR) genes results in the production of over 48 different isoforms of FGFR. These isoforms vary in their ligand-binding properties and kinase domains, however all share the common extracellular region composed of three immunoglobulin(Ig)-like domains (D1-D3), and thus belong to the immunoglobulin superfamily.

The three immunoglobin(Ig)-like domains—D1, D2, and D3—present a stretch of acidic amino acids ("the acid box") between D1 and D2. This "acid box" can participate in the regulation of FGF binding to the FGFR. Immunoglobulin-like domains D2 and D3 are sufficient for FGF binding. Each receptor can be activated by several FGFs. In many cases, the FGFs themselves can also activate more than one receptor (i.e., FGF1, which binds all seven principal FGFRs). FGF7, however, can only activate FGFR2b, and FGF18 was recently shown to activate FGFR3.

A gene for a fifth FGFR protein, FGFR5, has also been identified. In contrast to FGFRs 1-4, it lacks a cytoplasmic tyrosine kinase domain and one isoform, FGFR5γ, and only contains the extracellular domains D1 and D2. The FGFRs are known to dimerize as heterodimers and homodimers.

== Genes ==
So far, five distinct membrane FGFR have been identified in vertebrates and all of them belong to the tyrosine kinase superfamily (FGFR1 to FGFR4).

- FGFR1 (see also Fibroblast growth factor receptor 1) (= CD331)
- FGFR2 (see also Fibroblast growth factor receptor 2) (= CD332)
- FGFR3 (see also Fibroblast growth factor receptor 3) (= CD333)
- FGFR4 (see also Fibroblast growth factor receptor 4) (= CD334)
- FGFRL1 (see also Fibroblast growth factor receptor-like 1)
- FGFR6

== As a drug target ==
The FGF/FGFR signalling pathway is involved in a variety of cancers.

There are non-selective FGFR inhibitors that act on all of FGFR1-4 and other proteins, and some selective FGFR inhibitors for some/all of FGFR1-4. Selective FGFR inhibitors include AZD4547, BGJ398, JNJ42756493, and PD173074.
