= FGF22 =

Protein

Identifiers
- Aliases: FGF22, fibroblast growth factor 22
- External IDs: OMIM: 605831; MGI: 1914362; GeneCards: FGF22

Gene location (Human)
Chr.	Chromosome 19 (human)
Band	19p13.3	Start	639,879 bp
Band	19p13.3	End	644,373 bp

Gene location (Mouse)
Chr.	Chromosome 10 (mouse)
Band	10|10 C1	Start	79,590,910 bp
Band	10|10 C1	End	79,594,430 bp
RNA expression pattern
Bgee	Human / Mouse (ortholog); Top expressed in: skin of leg; skin of abdomen; right frontal lobe; anterior cingulate cortex; Brodmann area 9; prefrontal cortex; left ovary; putamen; nucleus accumbens; amygdala / Top expressed in: lip; skin of abdomen; skin of back; esophagus; embryo; superior frontal gyrus; primary visual cortex; dentate gyrus of hippocampal formation granule cell; hair follicle; neural layer of retina; More reference expression data
BioGPS	n/a
Gene ontology
Molecular function	fibroblast growth factor receptor binding; growth factor activity; phosphatidylinositol-4,5-bisphosphate 3-kinase activity; protein tyrosine kinase activity; 1-phosphatidylinositol-3-kinase activity
Cellular component	extracellular region; extracellular space; nucleolus; Golgi apparatus; cell surface
Biological process	cell differentiation; MAPK cascade; fibroblast growth factor receptor signaling pathway; phosphatidylinositol phosphate biosynthetic process; peptidyl-tyrosine phosphorylation; phosphatidylinositol-3-phosphate biosynthetic process; regulation of signaling receptor activity; positive regulation of protein kinase B signaling
Sources:Amigo / QuickGO
Orthologs
Databases	NCBI: entry; OMA: entry
Species	Human	Mouse
Entrez	27006	67112
Ensembl	ENSG00000070388	ENSMUSG00000020327
UniProt	Q9HCT0	Q9ESS2
RefSeq (mRNA)	NM_020637; NM_001300812	NM_023304; NM_001368662
RefSeq (protein)	NP_001287741; NP_065688	NP_075793; NP_001355591
Location (UCSC)	Chr 19: 0.64 – 0.64 Mb	Chr 10: 79.59 – 79.59 Mb
PubMed search
- Wikidata
View/Edit Human	View/Edit Mouse

Fibroblast growth factor 22 is a protein which in humans is encoded by the FGF22 gene.

== Function ==
The protein encoded by this gene is a member of the fibroblast growth factor (FGF) family. FGF family members possess broad mitogenic and cell survival activities, and are involved in a variety of biological processes, including embryonic development, cell growth, morphogenesis, tissue repair, tumor growth and invasion. The mouse homolog of this gene was found to be preferentially expressed in the inner root sheath of the hair follicle, which suggested a role in hair development.
