= Fibroblast growth factor receptor-like 1 =

Protein found in humans

FGFRL1

Identifiers
- Aliases: FGFRL1, FGFR5, FHFR, fibroblast growth factor receptor-like 1, fibroblast growth factor receptor like 1, FGFR-5
- External IDs: OMIM: 605830; MGI: 2150920; GeneCards: FGFRL1

Gene location (Human)
Chr.	Chromosome 4 (human)
Band	4p16.3	Start	1,009,936 bp
Band	4p16.3	End	1,026,898 bp

Gene location (Mouse)
Chr.	Chromosome 5 (mouse)
Band	5|5 F	Start	108,840,248 bp
Band	5|5 F	End	108,854,790 bp
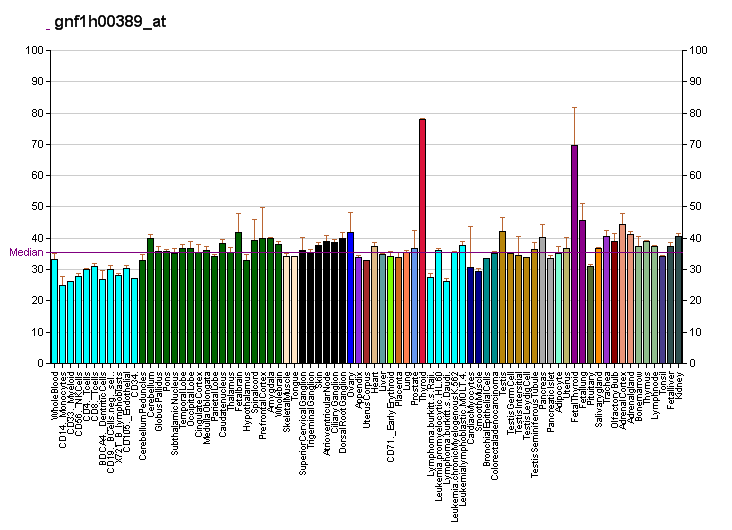
RNA expression pattern
Bgee	Human / Mouse (ortholog); Top expressed in: right uterine tube; left lobe of thyroid gland; right lobe of thyroid gland; body of pancreas; Descending thoracic aorta; ascending aorta; left adrenal gland; left adrenal cortex; right adrenal gland; right adrenal cortex / Top expressed in: basilar part of occipital bone; larynx; Paneth cell; laryngeal cartilages; ascending aorta; thumb; aortic valve; index finger; white adipose tissue; phalanx of index finger; More reference expression data
BioGPS	More reference expression data
Gene ontology
Molecular function	fibroblast growth factor binding; heparin binding; fibroblast growth factor-activated receptor activity
Cellular component	integral component of membrane; Golgi apparatus; transport vesicle; cell-cell contact zone; membrane; plasma membrane
Biological process	skeletal system development; ventricular septum morphogenesis; cell-cell adhesion via plasma-membrane adhesion molecules; substrate adhesion-dependent cell spreading; protein homooligomerization; heart valve morphogenesis; protein heterooligomerization; diaphragm development; negative regulation of cell population proliferation; fibroblast growth factor receptor signaling pathway
Sources:Amigo / QuickGO
Orthologs
Databases	NCBI: entry; OMA: entry
Species	Human	Mouse
Entrez	53834	116701
Ensembl	ENSG00000127418	ENSMUSG00000008090
UniProt	Q8N441	Q91V87
RefSeq (mRNA)	NM_001004356; NM_001004358; NM_021923; NM_001370296; NM_017862	NM_001164259; NM_054071
RefSeq (protein)	NP_001004356; NP_001004358; NP_068742; NP_001357225; NP_001004356.1	NP_001157731; NP_473412
Location (UCSC)	Chr 4: 1.01 – 1.03 Mb	Chr 5: 108.84 – 108.85 Mb
PubMed search
- Wikidata
View/Edit Human	View/Edit Mouse

Fibroblast growth factor receptor-like 1 is a protein that in humans is encoded by the FGFRL1 gene.

The protein encoded by this gene is a member of the fibroblast growth factor receptor (FGFR) family, where amino acid sequence is highly conserved between members and throughout evolution. FGFR family members differ from one another in their ligand affinities and tissue distribution. A full-length representative protein would consist of an extracellular region, composed of three immunoglobulin-like domains, a single hydrophobic membrane-spanning segment and a cytoplasmic tyrosine kinase domain. The extracellular portion of the protein interacts with fibroblast growth factors, setting in motion a cascade of downstream signals, ultimately influencing mitogenesis and differentiation. A marked difference between this gene product and the other family members is its lack of a cytoplasmic tyrosine kinase domain. The result is a transmembrane receptor that could interact with other family members and potentially inhibit signaling. Multiple alternatively spliced transcript variants encoding the same isoform have been found for this gene.

Transgenic mice expressing the giraffe ortholog of FGFRL1 are resistant against hypertension induced by angiotensin II.
