= FGF20 =

Protein

Identifiers
- Aliases: FGF20, FGF-20, RHDA2, fibroblast growth factor 20
- External IDs: OMIM: 605558; MGI: 1891346; GeneCards: FGF20
Available structures
PDB	Ortholog search: PDBe RCSB
PDB	List of PDB id codes 3F1R

Gene location (Human)
Chr.	Chromosome 8 (human)
Band	8p22	Start	16,992,181 bp
Band	8p22	End	17,002,345 bp

Gene location (Mouse)
Chr.	Chromosome 8 (mouse)
Band	8|8 A4	Start	40,732,207 bp
Band	8|8 A4	End	40,761,372 bp
RNA expression pattern
Bgee	Human / Mouse (ortholog); Top expressed in: buccal mucosa cell; cerebellar cortex; cerebellar hemisphere; right hemisphere of cerebellum; C1 segment; prefrontal cortex; Brodmann area 9; spleen; right adrenal gland; gonad / Top expressed in: coronal suture; frontal suture; sagittal suture; Smooth muscle tissue of renal pelvis; little finger; embryo; enamel knot; muscle of thigh; surface ectoderm; respiratory epithelium; More reference expression data
BioGPS	n/a
Gene ontology
Molecular function	fibroblast growth factor receptor binding; 1-phosphatidylinositol-3-kinase activity; protein tyrosine kinase activity; phosphatidylinositol-4,5-bisphosphate 3-kinase activity; signaling receptor binding; growth factor activity; heparan sulfate proteoglycan binding; receptor-receptor interaction
Cellular component	extracellular region; intracellular anatomical structure
Biological process	regulation of cardiac muscle cell proliferation; MAPK cascade; positive regulation of ERK1 and ERK2 cascade; signal transduction; cell-cell signaling; cell differentiation; inner ear receptor cell differentiation; fibroblast growth factor receptor signaling pathway; phosphatidylinositol phosphate biosynthetic process; peptidyl-tyrosine phosphorylation; phosphatidylinositol-3-phosphate biosynthetic process; positive regulation of cell population proliferation; regulation of dopamine secretion; negative regulation of neuron apoptotic process; regulation of neuron differentiation; positive regulation of dopaminergic neuron differentiation; regulation of signaling receptor activity; positive regulation of protein kinase B signaling
Sources:Amigo / QuickGO
Orthologs
Databases	NCBI: entry; OMA: entry
Species	Human	Mouse
Entrez	26281	80857
Ensembl	ENSG00000078579	ENSMUSG00000031603
UniProt	Q9NP95	Q9ESL9
RefSeq (mRNA)	NM_019851	NM_030610
RefSeq (protein)	NP_062825	NP_085113
Location (UCSC)	Chr 8: 16.99 – 17 Mb	Chr 8: 40.73 – 40.76 Mb
PubMed search
- Wikidata
View/Edit Human	View/Edit Mouse

Fibroblast growth factor 20 is a protein which in humans is encoded by the FGF20 gene.

== Function ==
The protein encoded by this gene is a member of the fibroblast growth factor (FGF) family. FGF family members possess broad mitogenic and cell survival activities, and are involved in a variety of biological processes, including embryonic development, cell growth, morphogenesis, tissue repair, tumor growth and invasion. This gene was shown to be expressed in normal brain, particularly the cerebellum. The rat homolog is preferentially expressed in the brain and able to enhance the survival of midbrain dopaminergic neurons in vitro.
