= Farnesoid X receptor =

Protein found in humans

NR1H4
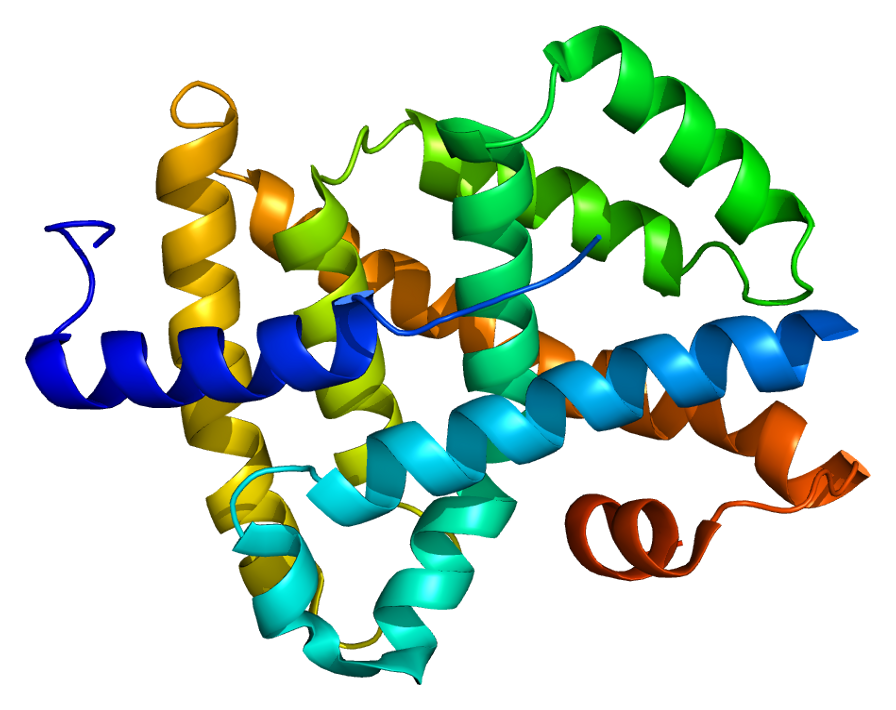

Identifiers
- Aliases: NR1H4, BAR, FXR, HRR-1, HRR1, RIP14, nuclear receptor subfamily 1 group H member 4, PFIC5
- External IDs: OMIM: 603826; MGI: 1352464; GeneCards: NR1H4
Available structures
PDB	Ortholog search: PDBe RCSB
PDB	List of PDB id codes 1OSH, 3BEJ, 3DCT, 3DCU, 3FLI, 3FXV, 3GD2, 3HC5, 3HC6, 3L1B, 3OKH, 3OKI, 3OLF, 3OMK, 3OMM, 3OOF, 3OOK, 3RUT, 3RUU, 3RVF, 3P88, 3P89, 4OIV, 4WVD, 4QE6, 4QE8

Gene location (Human)
Chr.	Chromosome 12 (human)
Band	12q23.1	Start	100,473,708 bp
Band	12q23.1	End	100,564,414 bp

Gene location (Mouse)
Chr.	Chromosome 10 (mouse)
Band	10 C2|10 44.98 cM	Start	89,290,096 bp
Band	10 C2|10 44.98 cM	End	89,369,447 bp
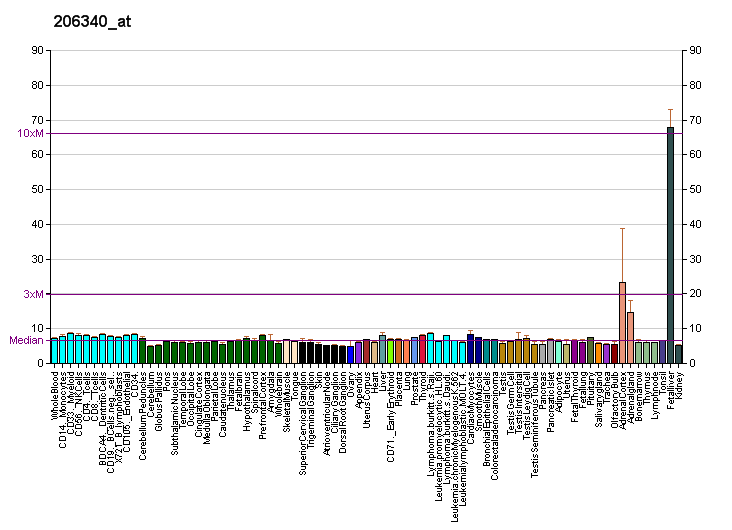
RNA expression pattern
Bgee	Human / Mouse (ortholog); Top expressed in: right lobe of liver; mucosa of ileum; right adrenal gland; right adrenal cortex; oocyte; left adrenal gland; left adrenal cortex; jejunal mucosa; duodenum; secondary oocyte / Top expressed in: right kidney; epithelium of small intestine; ileum; left lobe of liver; human kidney; proximal tubule; Ileal epithelium; Paneth cell; jejunum; migratory enteric neural crest cell; More reference expression data
BioGPS	More reference expression data
Gene ontology
Molecular function	RNA polymerase II cis-regulatory region sequence-specific DNA binding; sequence-specific DNA binding; DNA binding; transcription corepressor activity; DNA-binding transcription factor activity; transcription coactivator activity; zinc ion binding; DNA-binding transcription activator activity, RNA polymerase II-specific; metal ion binding; retinoid X receptor binding; steroid hormone receptor activity; bile acid binding; protein binding; nuclear receptor binding; transcription factor activity, RNA polymerase II distal enhancer sequence-specific binding; chenodeoxycholic acid binding; transcription cis-regulatory region binding; RNA polymerase II transcription regulatory region sequence-specific DNA binding; nuclear receptor activity; bile acid receptor activity; DNA-binding transcription factor activity, RNA polymerase II-specific; transcription factor binding; nuclear receptor coactivator activity; signaling receptor activity
Cellular component	nucleoplasm; nucleus; RNA polymerase II transcription regulator complex
Biological process	Notch signaling pathway; cellular triglyceride homeostasis; cellular response to organonitrogen compound; regulation of insulin secretion involved in cellular response to glucose stimulus; positive regulation of ammonia assimilation cycle; toll-like receptor 4 signaling pathway; immune system process; histone H3-R17 methylation; regulation of transcription by RNA polymerase II; positive regulation of glutamate metabolic process; intracellular bile acid receptor signaling pathway; negative regulation of apoptotic process; negative regulation of transcription by RNA polymerase II; transcription, DNA-templated; regulation of low-density lipoprotein particle clearance; regulation of bile acid biosynthetic process; regulation of cholesterol metabolic process; regulation of urea metabolic process; intracellular receptor signaling pathway; negative regulation of bile acid biosynthetic process; cellular response to fatty acid; bile acid and bile salt transport; nitrogen catabolite activation of transcription from RNA polymerase II promoter; transcription initiation from RNA polymerase II promoter; inflammatory response; innate immune response; signal transduction; steroid hormone mediated signaling pathway; fatty acid homeostasis; positive regulation of insulin receptor signaling pathway; cellular response to lipopolysaccharide; negative regulation of interleukin-2 production; positive regulation of insulin secretion involved in cellular response to glucose stimulus; negative regulation of inflammatory response; glucose homeostasis; negative regulation of NF-kappaB transcription factor activity; positive regulation of adipose tissue development; cell-cell junction assembly; toll-like receptor 9 signaling pathway; negative regulation of monocyte chemotactic protein-1 production; bile acid metabolic process; negative regulation of I-kappaB kinase/NF-kappaB signaling; negative regulation of tumor necrosis factor-mediated signaling pathway; defense response to bacterium; negative regulation of interleukin-1 production; negative regulation of tumor necrosis factor production; negative regulation of interleukin-6 production; triglyceride homeostasis; negative regulation of interferon-gamma production; regulation of transcription, DNA-templated; bile acid signaling pathway; positive regulation of transcription by RNA polymerase II; positive regulation of phosphatidic acid biosynthetic process; cholesterol homeostasis; lipid metabolism; multicellular organism development; cell differentiation; lipid homeostasis; cellular glucose homeostasis
Sources:Amigo / QuickGO
Orthologs
Databases	NCBI: entry; OMA: entry
Species	Human	Mouse
Entrez	9971	20186
Ensembl	ENSG00000012504	ENSMUSG00000047638
UniProt	Q96RI1	Q60641
RefSeq (mRNA)	NM_001206977; NM_001206978; NM_001206979; NM_001206992; NM_001206993 NM_005123	NM_001163504; NM_001163700; NM_009108; NM_001385711
RefSeq (protein)	NP_001193906; NP_001193907; NP_001193908; NP_001193921; NP_001193922 NP_005114; NP_001193906.1; NP_001193908.1	NP_001156976; NP_001157172; NP_033134; NP_001372640
Location (UCSC)	Chr 12: 100.47 – 100.56 Mb	Chr 10: 89.29 – 89.37 Mb
PubMed search
- Wikidata
View/Edit Human	View/Edit Mouse

Farnesoid X receptor (FXR), also known as NR1H4 (nuclear receptor subfamily 1, group H, member 4) or bile acid receptor (BAR), is a nuclear receptor that is encoded by the NR1H4 gene in humans.

== Function ==
FXR is expressed at high levels in the liver and intestine. Chenodeoxycholic acid and other bile acids are natural ligands for FXR. Similar to other nuclear receptors, when activated, FXR translocates to the cell nucleus, forms a dimer (in this case a heterodimer with RXR) and binds to hormone response elements on DNA, which up- or down-regulates the expression of certain genes.

One of the primary functions of FXR activation is the suppression of cholesterol 7 alpha-hydroxylase (CYP7A1), the rate-limiting enzyme in bile acid synthesis from cholesterol. FXR does not directly bind to the CYP7A1 promoter. Rather, FXR induces expression of small heterodimer partner (SHP), which then functions to inhibit transcription of the CYP7A1 gene. FXR likewise stimulates the synthesis of fibroblast growth factor 19, which also inhibits expression of CYP7A1 and sterol 12-alpha-hydroxylase (CYP8B1) via fibroblast growth factor receptor 4. In this way, a negative feedback pathway is established in which synthesis of bile acids is inhibited when cellular levels are already high.

The absence of FXR in an FXR^{-/-} mouse model led to increased bile acids in the liver, and the spontaneous development of liver tumors. Reducing the pool of bile acids in the FXR^{-/-} mice by feeding the bile acid sequestering resin cholestyramine reduced the number and size of the malignant lesions.

FXR has also been found to be important in regulation of hepatic triglyceride levels. Specifically, FXR activation suppresses lipogenesis and promotes free fatty acid oxidation by PPARα activation. Studies have also shown the FXR to regulate the expression and activity of epithelial transport proteins involved in fluid homeostasis in the intestine, such as the cystic fibrosis transmembrane conductance regulator (CFTR).

Activation of FXR in diabetic mice reduces plasma glucose and improves insulin sensitivity, whereas inactivation of FXR has the opposite effect.

=== Gastroesophageal adenocarcinoma ===
FXR is an important modulator of bile acid homeostasis. Loss of FXR or bile-acid dependent inhibition of FXR in progenitor cells at the gastroesophageal junction drives gastroesophageal adenocarcinoma carcinogenesis.

== Interactions ==
Farnesoid X receptor has been shown to interact with:

- Peroxisome proliferator-activated receptor gamma coactivator 1-alpha and
- Retinoid X receptor alpha.

== Ligands ==
A number of ligands for FXR are known, of both natural and synthetic origin.

Agonists

- Cafestol
- Chenodeoxycholic acid
- Fexaramine
- GW 4064
- Ivermectin
- Obeticholic acid
- Tropifexor

Antagonists

- Guggulsterone

== See also ==
- Ecdysone receptor – Insect ortholog
