= Fibroblast growth factor receptor 4 =

Protein-coding gene in the species Homo sapiens

FGFR4

Identifiers
- Aliases: FGFR4, CD334, JTK2, TKF, fibroblast growth factor receptor 4
- External IDs: OMIM: 134935; MGI: 95525; GeneCards: FGFR4
Available structures
PDB	Ortholog search: PDBe RCSB
PDB	List of PDB id codes 4QQ5, 4QQC, 4QQJ, 4QQT, 4QRC, 4R6V, 4TYE, 4TYG, 4TYI, 4TYJ, 4UXQ, 4XCU
Enzyme activity
EC #	BRENDA	ExPASy	KEGG	MetaCyc
2.7.10.1	↗	↗	↗	↗

Gene location (Human)
Chr.	Chromosome 5 (human)
Band	5q35.2	Start	177,086,905 bp
Band	5q35.2	End	177,098,144 bp

Gene location (Mouse)
Chr.	Chromosome 13 (mouse)
Band	13 B1|13 29.8 cM	Start	55,300,453 bp
Band	13 B1|13 29.8 cM	End	55,316,572 bp
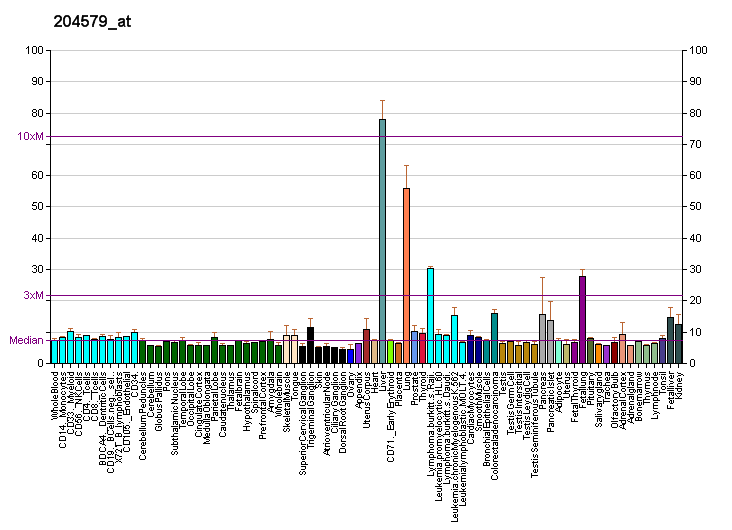

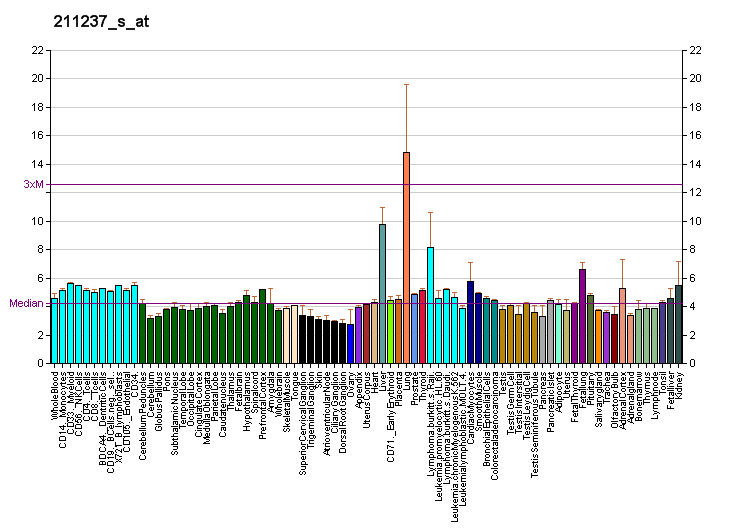
RNA expression pattern
Bgee	Human / Mouse (ortholog); Top expressed in: right lobe of liver; upper lobe of left lung; right lung; body of pancreas; mucosa of transverse colon; left ovary; lower lobe of lung; right ovary; spleen; right adrenal gland / Top expressed in: left lung lobe; tongue muscle; right kidney; yolk sac; left lobe of liver; internal carotid artery; vestibular membrane of cochlear duct; utricle; vestibular sensory epithelium; human kidney; More reference expression data
BioGPS	More reference expression data
Gene ontology
Molecular function	transferase activity; nucleotide binding; protein kinase activity; heparin binding; kinase activity; protein binding; transmembrane receptor protein tyrosine kinase activity; protein tyrosine kinase activity; fibroblast growth factor binding; fibroblast growth factor-activated receptor activity; ATP binding; phosphatidylinositol-4,5-bisphosphate 3-kinase activity; 1-phosphatidylinositol-3-kinase activity; receptor tyrosine kinase; transmembrane signaling receptor activity
Cellular component	integral component of membrane; endosome; Golgi apparatus; membrane; cell-cell junction; plasma membrane; integral component of plasma membrane; transport vesicle; extracellular region; endoplasmic reticulum; cytoplasm; receptor complex
Biological process	glucose homeostasis; phosphorylation; phosphate ion homeostasis; response to bile acid; regulation of extracellular matrix disassembly; MAPK cascade; regulation of bile acid biosynthetic process; fibroblast growth factor receptor signaling pathway; regulation of lipid metabolic process; protein phosphorylation; positive regulation of gene expression; positive regulation of cell population proliferation; positive regulation of DNA biosynthetic process; positive regulation of ERK1 and ERK2 cascade; positive regulation of proteolysis; protein autophosphorylation; peptidyl-tyrosine phosphorylation; cell migration; phosphatidylinositol phosphate biosynthetic process; positive regulation of catalytic activity; phosphatidylinositol-3-phosphate biosynthetic process; positive regulation of protein kinase B signaling; cholesterol homeostasis; angiogenesis; negative regulation of signal transduction; cell differentiation; negative regulation of apoptotic process; transmembrane receptor protein tyrosine kinase signaling pathway; nervous system development
Sources:Amigo / QuickGO
Orthologs
Databases	NCBI: entry; OMA: entry
Species	Human	Mouse
Entrez	2264	14186
Ensembl	ENSG00000160867	ENSMUSG00000005320
UniProt	P22455	Q03142
RefSeq (mRNA)	NM_001291980; NM_002011; NM_022963; NM_213647; NM_001354984	NM_008011
RefSeq (protein)	NP_001278909; NP_002002; NP_075252; NP_998812; NP_001341913	NP_032037
Location (UCSC)	Chr 5: 177.09 – 177.1 Mb	Chr 13: 55.3 – 55.32 Mb
PubMed search
- Wikidata
View/Edit Human	View/Edit Mouse

Fibroblast growth factor receptor 4 (FGFR-4) is a protein that in humans is encoded by the FGFR4 gene. FGFR4 has also been designated as CD334 (cluster of differentiation 334).

The protein encoded by this gene is a member of the fibroblast growth factor receptor family, where amino acid sequence is highly conserved between members and throughout evolution. FGFR family members differ from one another in their ligand affinities and tissue distribution. A full-length representative protein would consist of an extracellular region, composed of three immunoglobulin-like domains, a single hydrophobic membrane-spanning segment and a cytoplasmic tyrosine kinase domain. The extracellular portion of the protein interacts with fibroblast growth factors, setting in motion a cascade of downstream signals, ultimately influencing mitogenesis and differentiation. The genomic organization of this gene, compared to members 1-3, encompasses 18 exons rather than 19 or 20. Although alternative splicing has been observed, there is no evidence that the C-terminal half of the IgIII domain of this protein varies between three alternate forms, as indicated for members 1-3. This particular family member preferentially binds acidic fibroblast growth factor and, although its specific function is unknown, it is overexpressed in gynecological tumor samples, suggesting a role in breast and ovarian tumorigenesis. In a meta-analysis study, the functional polymorphism Gly388Arg (rs351855) of FGFR4 was observed to be significantly associated with nodal involvement and overall survival in patients with different types of cancer.

== Interactions ==
Fibroblast growth factor receptor 4 has been shown to interact with FGF1.
