= Autoantibody =

Antibody directed against an autogenic protein

An autoantibody is an antibody (a type of protein) produced by the immune system that is directed against one or more of the individual's own proteins. Many autoimmune diseases (notably lupus erythematosus) are associated with such antibodies.

== Production ==
Antibodies are produced by B cells in two ways: (i) randomly, and (ii) in response to a foreign protein or substance within the body. Initially, one B cell produces one specific kind of antibody. In either case, the B cell is allowed to proliferate or is killed off through a process called clonal deletion. Normally, the process of central tolerance and peripheral tolerance eliminates and suppresses B cells which are able to recognize the body's own healthy proteins, cells and tissues, preventing the development of autoimmune disease. Sometimes, the immune system ceases to recognize one or more of the body's normal constituents as "self", leading to production of pathological autoantibodies. Autoantibodies may also play a nonpathological role; for instance they may help the body to destroy cancers and to eliminate waste products. The role of autoantibodies in normal immune function is also a subject of scientific research.

== Cause ==
The causes of autoantibody production are varied and not well understood. It is thought that some autoantibody production is due to a genetic predisposition combined with an environmental trigger, such as a viral illness or a prolonged exposure to certain toxic chemicals. There is generally not a direct genetic link however. While families may be susceptible to autoimmune conditions, individual family members may have different autoimmune disorders, or may never develop an autoimmune condition. Researchers believe that there may also be a hormonal component as many of the autoimmune conditions are much more prevalent in women of childbearing age. While the initial event that leads to the production of autoantibodies is still unknown, there is a body of evidence that autoantibodies may have the capacity to maintain their production.

== Diseases ==
The type of autoimmune disorder or disease that occurs and the amount of destruction done to the body depends on which systems or organs are targeted by the autoantibodies, and how strongly. Disorders caused by organ specific autoantibodies, those that primarily target a single organ, (such as the thyroid in Graves' disease and Hashimoto's thyroiditis), are often the easiest to diagnose as they frequently present with organ related symptoms. Disorders due to systemic autoantibodies can be much more elusive. Although the associated autoimmune disorders are rare, the signs and symptoms they cause are relatively common. Symptoms may include: arthritis-type joint pain, fatigue, fever, rashes, cold or allergy-type symptoms, weight loss, and muscular weakness. Associated conditions include vasculitis which are inflammation of blood vessels and anemia. Even if they are due to a particular systemic autoimmune condition, the symptoms will vary from person to person, vary over time, vary with organ involvement, and they may taper off or flare unexpectedly. Add to this the fact that a person may have more than one autoantibody, and thus have more than one autoimmune disorder, and/or have an autoimmune disorder without a detectable level of an autoantibody, complicating making a diagnosis.

Examples of autoimmune diseases illustrate how autoantibodies can cause tissue-specific damage through different mechanisms. One example is Rheumatoid arthritis, an autoimmune disease in which the immune system produces autoantibodies that attack the body’s own joint tissues Environmental factors, such as infections or inhaled irritants, can change the body’s proteins, leading to their recognition as foreign and the production of autoantibodies. However, autoantibodies alone are insufficient to cause disease, and additional triggers are required to drive inflammation. These triggers then lead to the release of inflammatory molecules that recruit immune cells to the lining of the joints, where they begin to damage cartilage and bone. Persistent inflammation in the joint can also promote ongoing autoantibody production, creating a self-perpetuating cycle of immune activation. This explains why rheumatoid arthritis is typically a long-term, progressively worsening condition.

Another example is Pemphigus, a group of autoimmune diseases in which autoantibodies attack proteins in the skin responsible for cell adhesion. This results in skin cells losing the ability to remain attached to one another, leading to the separation of skin layers and the formation of fragile blisters. The development of pemphigus is thought to involve a combination of genetic susceptibility and environmental factors, including infections, certain medications, and other external triggers. Different forms of pemphigus affect different proteins. For instance, pemphigus foliaceus targets proteins in the upper layers of the skin, often leading to superficial blisters that rupture easily and leave behind crusted or scaly skin. In contrast, pemphigus vulgaris targets proteins in the deeper layers of the skin, resulting in more severe blistering. This form also commonly affects the mucous membranes, particularly the mouth.

The diagnosis of disorders associated with systemic autoantibodies starts with a complete medical history and a thorough physical exam. Based on the patient's signs and symptoms, the doctor may request one or more diagnostic studies that will help to identify a specific disease. As a rule, information is required from multiple sources, rather than a single laboratory test to accurately diagnose disorders associated with systemic autoantibodies. Tests may include:

- blood tests to detect inflammation, autoantibodies, and organ involvement
- x-rays and other imaging scans to detect changes in bones, joints, and organs
- biopsies to look for pathologic changes in tissue specimens

== Indications for autoantibody tests ==
Autoantibody tests may be ordered as part of an investigation of chronic progressive arthritis type symptoms and/or unexplained fevers, fatigue, muscle weakness and rashes. The antinuclear antibody (ANA) test is often ordered first. ANA is a marker of the autoimmune process – it is positive with a variety of different autoimmune diseases but not specific. Consequently, if an ANA test is positive, it is often followed up with other tests associated with arthritis and inflammation, such as a rheumatoid factor (RF), an erythrocyte sedimentation rate (ESR), a c-reactive protein (CRP), and/or complement protein|complement levels.

A single autoantibody test is not diagnostic, but may give clues as to whether a particular disorder is likely or unlikely to be present. Each autoantibody result should be considered individually and as part of the group. Some disorders, such as systemic lupus erythematosus (SLE) may be more likely if several autoantibodies are present, while others, such as mixed connective tissue disease (MCTD) may be more likely if a single autoantibody, ribonucleic protein (RNP), is the only one present. Those who have more than one autoimmune disorder may have several detectable autoantibodies.

Whether a particular autoantibody will be present is both very individual and a matter of statistics. Each will be present in a certain percentage of people who have a particular autoimmune disorder. For instance, up to 80% of those with SLE will have a positive double strand anti-double stranded DNA (anti-dsDNA) autoantibody test, but only about 25–30% will have a positive RNP. Some individuals who do have an autoimmune disorder will have negative autoantibody test results, but at a later date – as the disorder progresses - the autoantibodies may develop.

Systemic autoantibody tests are used to:

- Help diagnose systemic autoimmune disorders.
- Help determine the degree of organ or system involvement and damage (Along with other tests such as a complete blood count or comprehensive metabolic panel)
- Monitor the course of the disorder and the effectiveness of treatments. There is no prevention or cure for autoimmune disorders at this time. Treatment is used to alleviate symptoms and to help maintain body function.
- Monitor remissions, flares, and relapses

== Antibody profiling ==
Antibody profiling is used for identifying persons from forensic samples. The technology can uniquely identify a person by analyzing the antibodies in body fluids. A unique, individual set of antibodies, called individual specific autoantibodies (ISA), is found in blood, serum, saliva, urine, semen, perspiration, tears, and body tissues, and the antibodies are not affected by illness, medication, or food/drug intake. An unskilled technician using inexpensive equipment can complete a test in a couple of hours.

== List of some autoantibodies and commonly associated diseases ==
Note: the sensitivity and specificity of various autoantibodies for a particular disease is different for different diseases.

Autoantibody		Antibody target	Condition
Antinuclear antibodies	Anti-SSA/Ro autoantibodies	ribonucleoproteins	systemic lupus erythematosus, neonatal heart block, primary Sjögren syndrome
Antinuclear antibodies	Anti-La/SS-B autoantibodies	ribonucleoproteins	Primary Sjögren syndrome
Antinuclear antibodies	Anti-centromere antibodies	centromere	CREST syndrome
Antinuclear antibodies	Anti-dsDNA	double-stranded DNA	SLE
Antinuclear antibodies	Anti-Jo1	histidine-tRNA ligase	inflammatory myopathy
Antinuclear antibodies	Anti-RNP	Ribonucleoprotein	Mixed connective tissue disease
Antinuclear antibodies	Anti-Smith	snRNP core proteins	SLE
Antinuclear antibodies	Anti-topoisomerase antibodies	Type I topoisomerase	systemic sclerosis (anti-Scl-70 antibodies)
Antinuclear antibodies	Anti-histone antibodies	histones	SLE and drug-induced LE
Antinuclear antibodies	Anti-p62 antibodies	nucleoporin 62	primary biliary cirrhosis
Antinuclear antibodies	Anti-sp100 antibodies	Sp100 nuclear antigen	primary biliary cirrhosis
Antinuclear antibodies	Anti-glycoprotein-210 antibodies	nucleoporin 210kDa	primary biliary cirrhosis
Anti-transglutaminase antibodies	Anti-tTG		celiac disease
Anti-transglutaminase antibodies	Anti-eTG		dermatitis herpetiformis
Anti-ganglioside antibodies		ganglioside GQ1B	Miller Fisher syndrome
Anti-ganglioside antibodies		ganglioside GD3	acute motor axonal neuropathy (AMAN)
Anti-ganglioside antibodies		ganglioside GM1	multifocal motor neuropathy with conduction block (MMN)
Anti-actin antibodies		actin	Coeliac disease (antibody levels correlate with the level of intestinal damage), autoimmune hepatitis, gastric cancer
anti-CCP		cyclic citrullinated peptide	rheumatoid arthritis
Liver kidney microsomal type 1 antibody			autoimmune hepatitis
Lupus anticoagulant	Anti-thrombin antibodies	thrombin	systemic lupus erythematosus
Antiphospholipid antibodies		phospholipid	antiphospholipid syndrome
Anti-neutrophil cytoplasmic antibody	c-ANCA	proteins in neutrophil cytoplasm	granulomatosis with polyangiitis
Anti-neutrophil cytoplasmic antibody	p-ANCA	neutrophil perinuclear	microscopic polyangiitis, eosinophilic granulomatosis with polyangiitis, systemic vasculitides (non-specific)
Rheumatoid factor		IgG	rheumatoid arthritis
Anti-smooth muscle antibody		smooth muscle	chronic autoimmune hepatitis
Anti-mitochondrial antibody		mitochondria	primary biliary cirrhosis
Anti-SRP		signal recognition particle	dermatomyositis
		exosome complex	scleromyositis
Anti-AChR		nicotinic acetylcholine receptor	myasthenia gravis
Anti-MUSK		Muscle-specific kinase (MUSK)	myasthenia gravis
Anti-VGCC		voltage-gated calcium channel (P/Q-type)	Lambert–Eaton myasthenic syndrome
Anti-Vinculin		vinculin	small intestinal bacterial overgrowth
Anti-thyroid autoantibodies	Anti-TPO antibodies	Thyroid peroxidase (microsomal)	Hashimoto's thyroiditis, Graves' disease
Anti-thyroid autoantibodies	Anti-thyroglobulin antibodies (TgAbs)	Thyroglobulin	Hashimoto's thyroiditis
Anti-thyroid autoantibodies	Anti-thyrotropin receptor antibodies (TRAbs)	TSH receptor	Graves' disease
Anti-Hu (ANNA-1)		Neuronal nuclear proteins	paraneoplastic cerebellar degeneration, limbic encephalitis, encephalomyelitis, subacute sensory neuronopathy, choreathetosis
Anti-Yo		Cerebellar Purkinje cells	paraneoplastic cerebellar degeneration
Anti-Ma			encephalomyelitis, limbic encephalitis
Anti-Ri (ANNA-2)		Neuronal nuclear proteins	opsoclonus myoclonus syndrome
Anti-Tr		glutamate receptor	paraneoplastic cerebellar syndrome
Anti-amphiphysin		amphiphysin	stiff person syndrome, paraneoplastic cerebellar degeneration
Anti-GAD		Glutamate decarboxylase	stiff person syndrome, diabetes mellitus type 1
Anti-VGKC		voltage-gated potassium channel (VGKC)	limbic encephalitis, Isaac's Syndrome (autoimmune neuromyotonia)
Anti-CRMP-5		Collapsin response mediator protein 5	optic neuropathy, chorea
		basal ganglia neurons	Sydenham's chorea, paediatric autoimmune neuropsychiatric disease associated with Streptococcus (PANDAS)
Anti-NMDAr		N-methyl-D-aspartate receptor (NMDA)	anti-NMDA receptor encephalitis
NMO antibody		aquaporin-4	neuromyelitis optica (Devic's syndrome)
Anti-desmoglein (anti-desmosome)		Dsg3 (Desmoglein 3) and sometimes Dsg1	Pemphigus vulgaris
Anti-hemidesmosome		hemidesmosomes	Bullous pemphigoid
Anti-glomerular basement membrane		basement membrane in lungs and kidneys	Goodpasture syndrome
Anti-parietal cell		gastric parietal cells	Pernicious anemia
Anti-intrinsic factor		intrinsic factor	Pernicious anemia
Anti-phospholipase A2 receptor		phospholipase A2 receptor	Membranous nephropathy

== See also ==
- Anti-glutamate receptor antibodies
- Reference ranges for blood tests#Autoantibodies
- Paraneoplastic syndrome
