= Anti-glycoprotein-210 antibodies =

Autoantibody
Anti-glycoprotein-210
Autoantigen; Isoform	Nucleoporin 210kDa
Autoantigen gene	NUP210
Affected organ(s)	Bile Duct
Associated; Disease(s)	Primary biliary cirrhosis
HLA associations	DR2 (weak)

Anti-glycoprotein-210 antibodies (AGPA, anti-gp210, anti-nup210, anti-np210) are directed at gp210 and are found within primary biliary cirrhosis (PBC) patients in high frequency. AGPA recognize the cytoplasmic-oriented carboxyl terminus (tail) of the protein. While AGPA is found as a prognostic marker in only a minority of PBC patients, those that did had higher mortality and were predicted a poor outcome. In addition, patients that responded to ursodeoxycholic acid (UDCA) therapy and, therefore, had AGPA reductions failed to develop end-stage liver disease relative to untreated cohort with anti-gp210 Ab. PBC patients with potentially destructive AGPA have increased expression of Nup210 in the bile duct, a potential immune tolerance-escaping factor.

Anti-mitochondrial, anti-centromere and anti-p62 antibodies are also found in (PBC). While patients with AGPA progress toward end-stage liver failure, patients with anti-centromere antibodies often progress toward portal hypertension, further indicating a specific role of the AGPA in PBC.

== Notes ==
The glycoprotein gp210 is commonly used in the literature. The gene, NUP210, encodes the nuclear pore (nuclear porin) glycoprotein-210 that is a major component of the human nuclear pore complex.
