= Intercept Pharmaceuticals =

Pharmaceutical company

Coordinates: 40.678631°N 78.243038°W

Intercept Pharmaceuticals, Inc.
- Type: Subsidiary
- Traded as: Nasdaq: ICPT (2012-23)
- Industry: Biotechnology
- Founded: 2002; 24 years ago
- Fate: Acquired by Alfasigma
- Headquarters: Morristown, New Jersey, United States
- Key people: Jerome Durso (president and CEO); Paolo Fundarò (chairman of the Board of Directors)
- Revenue: ▲$250.2 Million (2019)
- Website: www.interceptpharma.com

Intercept Pharmaceuticals, Inc. is an American biopharmaceutical company incorporated in 2002, focusing on the development of novel synthetic bile acid analogs to treat chronic liver diseases, such as primary biliary cirrhosis (PBC) now called primary biliary cholangitis, non-alcoholic fatty liver disease (or non-alcoholic steatohepatitis, NASH), cirrhosis, portal hypertension, primary sclerosing cholangitis and also the intestinal disorder, bile acid diarrhea.

== Products ==
The company's lead product is Ocaliva (obeticholic acid, OCA), also known as 6-ethyl-chenodeoxycholic acid or INT-747. OCA is a potent first-in-class farnesoid X receptor (FXR) agonist. In 2016, the U.S. Food and Drug Administration (FDA) approved Ocaliva for use in primary biliary cholangitis.

In June 2024, the European Medicines Agency (EMA) recommended revoking the conditional marketing authorization for Ocaliva. The decision followed a review by the Committee for Medicinal Products for Human Use (CHMP), which concluded that the benefits of Ocaliva no longer outweigh its risks. The European Commission officially revoked Ocaliva's marketing authorization on August 30, 2024.

In November 2024, the U.S. Food and Drug Administration (FDA) declined to grant full approval for Ocaliva as a treatment for primary biliary cholangitis (PBC), a rare autoimmune liver disease. This decision followed a September 2024 advisory committee meeting where 13 out of 14 panel members concluded that Intercept's data did not adequately demonstrate Ocaliva's clinical benefit. Consequently, the FDA issued a complete response letter, indicating that the supplemental new drug application could not be approved in its current form. Despite this setback, Ocaliva remains available in the U.S. under the accelerated approval granted in 2016, which requires ongoing post-marketing studies to confirm its clinical benefits. The FDA is continuing to review data from these studies, including trial 747-302 (NCT02308111), and has noted concerns about serious liver injury in some patients without severe scarring.

Other products in the development pipeline include INT-767, a dual FXR/TGR5 agonist, and INT-777, a TGR5 agonist.

On June 29, 2020, the company released a statement announcing that FDA had rejected its lead product obeticholic acid, OCA, because FDA officials had determined that "the predicted benefit of the drug does not sufficiently outweigh the predicted risks".

== Initial public offering and stock history ==
Intercept traded on the NASDAQ exchange under the ticker symbol ICPT. The initial public offering of the stock on October 16, 2012 was at $15. A follow-on public offering at $33 took place on June 24, 2013.

On January 9, 2014, the stock skyrocketed from $72.39 to $275.49, or about 280%, after a planned interim analysis by the independent data safety monitoring board showed that Obeticholic acid met the main goal (improvement of liver histology) at the mid-stage in the FLINT trial in NASH, sponsored by NIDDK. The stock continued to climb to $497 over the next few days before falling back to around $317 on March 29, 2014, giving a market capitalization of around $6.2 billion.

In March 2014, the company released the results of the POISE study of Obeticholic acid in PBC, which showed the drug met the trial's primary endpoint of a reduction in serum alkaline phosphatase, a biomarker for the disease. These results were presented at an international liver meeting in April 2014.

As of 31 December 2014, the company has 136 employees.

In 2023, Intercept Pharmaceuticals was acquired by Italian Alfasigma S.p.A for $19.00 per share in cash (approximately $800 million).
