= Nucleoporin 210kDa =

Protein-coding gene in the species Homo sapiens

Identifiers
- Aliases: NUP210, Nup210, GP210, POM210, nucleoporin 210kDa, nucleoporin 210
- External IDs: OMIM: 607703; MGI: 1859555; HomoloGene: 41286; GeneCards: NUP210; OMA:NUP210 - orthologs

Gene location (Human)
Chr.	Chromosome 3 (human)
Band	3p25.1	Start	13,316,235 bp
Band	3p25.1	End	13,420,309 bp

Gene location (Mouse)
Chr.	Chromosome 6 (mouse)
Band	6 D1|6 40.3 cM	Start	90,990,050 bp
Band	6 D1|6 40.3 cM	End	91,093,811 bp
RNA expression pattern
Bgee	Human / Mouse (ortholog); Top expressed in: granulocyte; lymph node; bone marrow cells; buccal mucosa cell; thymus; spleen; blood; appendix; parotid gland; mononuclear cell / Top expressed in: mesenteric lymph nodes; fetal liver hematopoietic progenitor cell; tibiofemoral joint; spleen; blood; thymus; human fetus; hair follicle; bone marrow; Paneth cell; More reference expression data
BioGPS	n/a
Gene ontology
Molecular function	protein dimerization activity
Cellular component	nuclear membrane; integral component of membrane; nucleus; nuclear envelope; membrane; endoplasmic reticulum; endoplasmic reticulum membrane; nuclear pore; host cell
Biological process	mitotic nuclear membrane disassembly; viral transcription; viral process; protein sumoylation; protein transport; mRNA transport; regulation of cellular response to heat; intracellular transport of virus; mRNA export from nucleus; tRNA export from nucleus; regulation of gene silencing by miRNA; regulation of glycolytic process; transport
Sources:Amigo / QuickGO
Orthologs
Species	Human	Mouse
Entrez	23225	54563
Ensembl	ENSG00000132182	ENSMUSG00000030091
UniProt	Q8TEM1	Q9QY81
RefSeq (mRNA)	NM_024923	NM_018815
RefSeq (protein)	NP_079199	NP_061285
Location (UCSC)	Chr 3: 13.32 – 13.42 Mb	Chr 6: 90.99 – 91.09 Mb
PubMed search
- Wikidata
View/Edit Human	View/Edit Mouse

Nuclear pore glycoprotein-210 (gp210) is an essential trafficking regulator in the eukaryotic nuclear pore complex. Gp-210 anchors the pore complex to the nuclear membrane. and protein tagging reveals its primarily located on the luminal side of double layer membrane at the pore. A single polypeptide motif of gp210 is responsible for sorting to nuclear membrane, and indicate the carboxyl tail of the protein is oriented toward the cytoplasmic side of the membrane.

== Disassembly and Assembly ==
During eukaryotic mitosis the nuclear envelope disintegrates into vesicles dispersing nuclear lamina proteins and nuclear pore complexes. Nup210 is specifically phosphorylated on the C-terminal (cytoplasmic) domain in mitosis at Ser1880 and is dispersed throughout the endoplasmic reticulum during mitosis as homodimers. Nuclear lamins begin to reassemble around chromosomes at the end of mitosis. Nup210 lags the reassembly process relative to other Nups. and while much of the assembly process can occur without it, the final assembly and dilation of the complexes require Nup210. The replacement of serine at position 1880 with a phosphorylated 'looking' glutamate results in Nup210 complexes that fail to reassemble indicating that dephosphorylation of Nup210 within the final phases of proper assembly is required.

== Pathology ==
Recognized by anti-nuclear antibodies found in primary biliary cirrhosis (PBC) anti-Nup210 antibodies correlate with progression toward end stage liver disease. Nup210 is possibly a destructive autoimmune target of the disease. One idea for the loss of tolerance is the increased or abnormal expression of Nup210 in patients with PBC.

Anti-mitochondrial, anti-centromere and anti-nup62 are also found in PBC.
