= Anti-thrombin antibodies =

Class of autoantibodies found in mammals

Autoantibody
Anti-Thrombin
| Autoantigen; Isoform | coagulation- factor II |
| Autoantigen gene | F2 |
| Affected organ(s) | Cardiovascular |
| Affected tissue(s) | serum |
| Affected cell(s) | blood platelets |
| Also Affected | serum protein inhibitor |
| Associated; Disease(s) | Systemic lupus erythematosus |

Anti-thrombin antibodies are autoantibodies directed against thrombin that may constitute a fraction of lupus anticoagulant and are seen an increased levels in systemic lupus erythematosus.

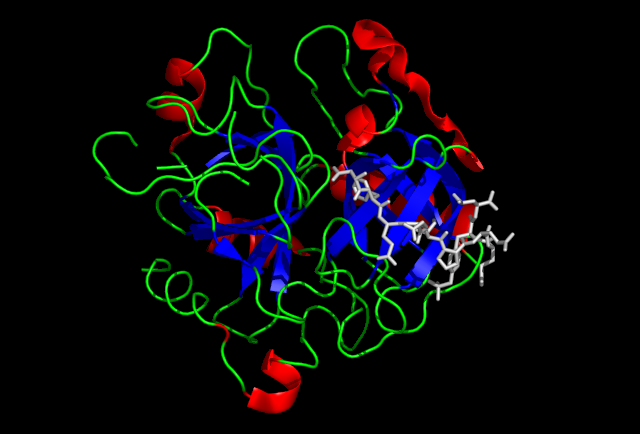
crystal structure of thrombin.

In mammals, there is normally occurring anti-thrombin activity (antithrombin III), which can be distinguished from autoimmune anti-thrombin. Anti-thrombin antibodies can react with both types of thrombin in the antithrombin-thrombin complex. Antibodies (IgG) against thrombin can strongly inhibit its activity. Inhibitory anti-thrombin antibodies can be divided into 2 groups, those that inhibit coagulation activity and those the inhibit coagulation and amidase activity. Autoimmune anti-thrombin was also found to inhibit the binding of antithrombin III to thrombin. Such activities are more often found with primary biliary cirrhosis. Multiple studies have shown, however, that despite autoimmune anti-thrombin thrombin inhibitory activity, these antibodies correlate with thrombotic events, so that they may also perturb the regulation of coagulatory factors.

Other than antibodies to thrombin, antibodies to vascular heparin sulfate appear to interfere with antithrombin-thrombin interaction.
