= Heat shock factor protein 1 =

Protein-coding gene in the species Homo sapiens

HSF1

Identifiers
- Aliases: HSF1, HSTF1, heat shock transcription factor 1
- External IDs: OMIM: 140580; MGI: 96238; GeneCards: HSF1
Available structures
| PDB | Ortholog search: PDBe RCSB |
| PDB | List of PDB id codes 2LDU, 5D5U, 5D5V |

Gene location (Human)
| Chr. | Chromosome 8 (human) |
| Band | 8q24.3 | Start | 144,291,591 bp |
| Band | 8q24.3 | End | 144,314,720 bp |
RNA expression pattern
| Bgee | Human / Mouse (ortholog); Top expressed in: apex of heart; left testis; right testis; left ventricle; muscle of thigh; right auricle of heart; stromal cell of endometrium; gastrocnemius muscle; popliteal artery; tibial arteries / n/a; More reference expression data |
| BioGPS | n/a |
Gene ontology
| Molecular function | DNA-binding transcription factor activity; chromatin binding; DNA-binding transcription repressor activity, RNA polymerase II-specific; protein binding; RNA polymerase II intronic transcription regulatory region sequence-specific DNA binding; sequence-specific single stranded DNA binding; DNA binding; protein kinase binding; heat shock protein binding; chromatin DNA binding; identical protein binding; sequence-specific DNA binding; protein self-association; protein heterodimerization activity; Hsp90 protein binding; translation elongation factor binding; promoter-specific chromatin binding; RNA polymerase II cis-regulatory region sequence-specific DNA binding; DNA-binding transcription factor activity, RNA polymerase II-specific; STAT family protein binding |
| Cellular component | cytoplasm; pronucleus; euchromatin; heterochromatin; nucleus; centrosome; cytosol; PML body; nuclear stress granule; mitotic spindle pole; ribonucleoprotein complex; chromosome, centromeric region; kinetochore; spindle pole; nucleoplasm; chromosome; microtubule organizing center; cytoskeleton; perinuclear region of cytoplasm; protein-containing complex |
| Biological process | defense response; regulation of transcription, DNA-templated; embryonic placenta development; mRNA transcription; in utero embryonic development; negative regulation of transcription by RNA polymerase II; response to heat; female meiotic nuclear division; transcription, DNA-templated; embryonic process involved in female pregnancy; protein phosphorylation; response to lipopolysaccharide; spermatogenesis; positive regulation of multicellular organism growth; negative regulation of tumor necrosis factor production; positive regulation of transcription by RNA polymerase II; negative regulation of cell population proliferation; response to organonitrogen compound; cellular response to lipopolysaccharide; negative regulation of gene expression; cellular response to amino acid stimulus; cellular response to hydrogen peroxide; positive regulation of microtubule binding; response to peptide; cellular response to nitroglycerin; negative regulation of cardiac muscle cell apoptotic process; response to estradiol; cellular response to organic cyclic compound; positive regulation of gene expression; positive regulation of cysteine-type endopeptidase activity involved in apoptotic process; cellular response to potassium ion; response to amino acid; negative regulation of inclusion body assembly; positive regulation of apoptotic DNA fragmentation; cellular response to L-glutamine; response to psychosocial stress; response to organic cyclic compound; negative regulation of neuron death; response to nutrient; cellular response to angiotensin; response to testosterone; response to hypobaric hypoxia; response to activity; cellular response to radiation; cellular response to estradiol stimulus; positive regulation of inclusion body assembly; MAPK cascade; positive regulation of cell population proliferation; cellular response to heat; Unfolded protein response; regulation of protein heterodimerization activity; positive regulation of mitotic cell cycle; protein homooligomerization; positive regulation of transcription from RNA polymerase II promoter in response to heat stress; protein homotrimerization; cellular response to cadmium ion; cellular response to copper ion; cellular response to gamma radiation; cellular response to diamide; regulation of cellular response to heat; positive regulation of mRNA polyadenylation; cellular response to sodium arsenite; negative regulation of double-strand break repair via nonhomologous end joining; DNA repair; mRNA processing; cellular response to DNA damage stimulus; mRNA transport; positive regulation of tyrosine phosphorylation of STAT protein; positive regulation of cold-induced thermogenesis |
Sources:Amigo / QuickGO
Orthologs
| Databases | NCBI: entry; OMA: entry |
| Species | Human | Mouse |
| Entrez | 3297 | 15499 |
| Ensembl | ENSG00000185122; ENSG00000284774 | ENSMUSG00000022556 |
| UniProt | Q00613 | P38532 |
| RefSeq (mRNA) | NM_005526 | NM_008296 |
| RefSeq (protein) | NP_005517 | NP_001318081; NP_001318082; NP_001318083; NP_001318143; NP_032322 |
| Location (UCSC) | Chr 8: 144.29 – 144.31 Mb | n/a |
| PubMed search |
- Wikidata
| View/Edit Human | View/Edit Mouse |

Heat shock factor protein 1 (HSF 1) is a protein that in humans is encoded by the HSF1 gene. HSF1 is highly conserved in eukaryotes and is the primary mediator of transcriptional responses to proteotoxic stress with important roles in non-stress regulation such as development and metabolism.

== Structure ==
Human HSF1 consists of several domains which regulate its binding and activity.

=== DNA-Binding Domain (DBD) ===
This N-terminal domain of approximately 100 amino acids is the most highly conserved region in the HSF protein family and consists of a helix-turn-helix loop. The DBD of each HSF1 monomer recognizes the sequence nGAAn on target DNA. Repeated sequences of the nGAAn pentamer constitute heat shock elements (HSEs) for active HSF1 trimers to bind.

=== Oligomerization Domain (Leucine Zipper Domains) ===
The two regions responsible for oligomerization between HSF1 monomers are leucine zipper (LZ) domains 1-3 and 4 (these regions are also commonly referred to as HR-A/B and HR-C). LZ1-3 is situated just downstream of the DBD while LZ4 is located between the RD and the C-terminal TAD. Under non-stress conditions, spontaneous HSF1 activation is negatively regulated by the interaction between LZ1-3 and LZ4. When induced by stress, the LZ1-3 region breaks away from the LZ4 region and forms a trimer with other HSF1 LZ1-3 domains to form a triple coiled-coil.

=== Regulatory Domain (RD) ===
The structures of the C-terminal RD and TAD of HSF1 have not been clearly resolved due to their dynamic nature. However, it is known that the RD is situated between the two regions of the oligomerization domain. The RD has been shown to regulate the TAD through negative control by repressing TAD in the absence of stress, a role that is inducibly regulated through posttranslational modifications.

=== Trans-Activation Domain (TAD) ===
This C-terminal region spans the last 150 amino acids of the HSF1 protein and contains 2 TADs (TAD1 and TAD2). TAD1, which sits at amino acids 401-420, is largely hydrophobic and is predicted to take on an alpha-helical conformation. TAD1 has been shown to directly interact with target DNA to direct HSF1's transcriptional activation. The structure of TAD2, amino acids 431-529, is not expected to be helical as it contains proline residues in addition to hydrophobic and acidic ones. The function of the HSF1 TAD is still largely uncharacterized, but Hsp70 has been shown to bind with this domain, which could describe the mechanism by which Hsp70 negatively regulates HSF1.

== Function ==
The HSF1 protein regulates the heat shock response (HSR) pathway in humans by acting as the major transcription factor for heat shock proteins. The HSR plays a protective role by ensuring proper folding and distribution of proteins within cells. This pathway is induced by not only temperature stress, but also by a variety of other stressors such as hypoxic conditions and exposure to contaminants. HSF1 transactivates genes for many cytoprotective proteins involved in heat shock, DNA damage repair, and metabolism. This illustrates the versatile role of HSF1 in not only the heat shock response, but also in aging and diseases.

== Mechanism of action ==
Under non-stress conditions, HSF1 exists primarily as an inactive monomer located throughout the nucleus and the cytoplasm. In its monomeric form, HSF1 activation is repressed by interaction with chaperones such as heat shock proteins Hsp70 and Hsp90, and TRiC/CCT. In the event of proteotoxic stress such as heat shock, these chaperones are released from HSF1 to perform their protein-folding roles; simultaneously, the export of HSF1 to the cytoplasm is inhibited. These actions allow HSF1 to trimerize and accumulate in the nucleus to stimulate transcription of target genes.

== Clinical significance ==
HSF1 is a promising drug target in cancer and proteopathy.

The genes activated by HSF1 under heat shock conditions have been recently shown to differ from those activated in malignant cancer cells, and this cancer-specific HSF1 panel of genes has indicated poor prognosis in breast cancer. The ability of cancer cells to use HSF1 in a unique manner gives this protein significant clinical implications for therapies and prognoses.

In the case of protein-folding diseases such as Huntington's disease (HD), however, induction of the heat shock response pathway would prove beneficial. In recent years, using cells that express the poly-glutamine expansion found in HD, it has been shown that both the HSR and HSF1 levels are reduced after heat shock. This reduced ability of diseased cells to respond to stress helps to explain the toxicity associated with certain diseases.

== Interactions ==
HSF1 has been shown to interact with:

CEBPB, HSF2, HSPA1A, HSPA4, Heat shock protein 90kDa alpha (cytosolic) member A1, NCOA6, RALBP1 and SYMPK.

== See also ==
- Heat shock factor
- Heat shock protein
- Transcription factor
