= Nuclear pore glycoprotein p62 =

Protein-coding gene in the species Homo sapiens

NUP62
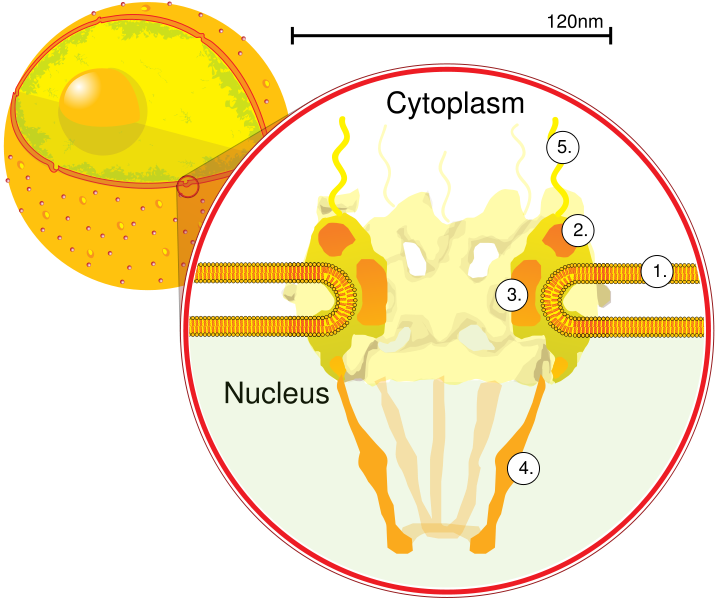
Available structures
PDB	Ortholog search: PDBe RCSB
PDB	List of PDB id codes 5IJN, 5IJO

Identifiers
- Aliases: NUP62, IBSN, SNDI, p62, nucleoporin 62kDa, nucleoporin 62
- External IDs: OMIM: 605815; MGI: 1351500; HomoloGene: 68773; GeneCards: NUP62; OMA:NUP62 - orthologs

Gene location (Human)
Chr.	Chromosome 19 (human)
Band	19q13.33	Start	49,906,825 bp
Band	19q13.33	End	49,929,763 bp

Gene location (Mouse)
Chr.	Chromosome 7 (mouse)
Band	7 B3|7 28.93 cM	Start	44,465,512 bp
Band	7 B3|7 28.93 cM	End	44,480,236 bp
RNA expression pattern
Bgee	Human / Mouse (ortholog); Top expressed in: right testis; left testis; granulocyte; embryo; ganglionic eminence; monocyte; oocyte; appendix; ventricular zone; glutes / Top expressed in: condyle; primitive streak; endothelial cell of lymphatic vessel; fossa; secondary oocyte; zygote; hair follicle; endocardial cushion; tail of embryo; renal corpuscle; More reference expression data
BioGPS	n/a
Gene ontology
Molecular function	Hsp90 protein binding; SH2 domain binding; chromatin binding; thyroid hormone receptor binding; PTB domain binding; Hsp70 protein binding; protein binding; ubiquitin binding; signaling receptor complex adaptor activity; structural constituent of nuclear pore; phospholipid binding; kinesin binding
Cellular component	nuclear membrane; Flemming body; nuclear pore; lamellae anulatae; cytoskeleton; nuclear pore central transport channel; spindle pole; cytoplasm; centrosome; mitotic spindle; nuclear envelope; microtubule organizing center; nucleus; protein-containing complex; ribonucleoprotein complex; host cell
Biological process	mRNA transport; negative regulation of epidermal growth factor receptor signaling pathway; regulation of Ras protein signal transduction; cell death; negative regulation of apoptotic process; transcription, DNA-templated; negative regulation of Ras protein signal transduction; positive regulation of transcription, DNA-templated; cell surface receptor signaling pathway; regulation of signal transduction; negative regulation of MAP kinase activity; spermatogenesis; regulation of protein import into nucleus; hormone-mediated signaling pathway; positive regulation of I-kappaB kinase/NF-kappaB signaling; protein transport; negative regulation of programmed cell death; nuclear transport; viral process; positive regulation of epidermal growth factor receptor signaling pathway; negative regulation of cell population proliferation; protein import into nucleus; mRNA export from nucleus; mitotic metaphase plate congression; mitotic centrosome separation; positive regulation of mitotic nuclear division; positive regulation of centriole replication; regulation of mitotic spindle organization; centriole assembly; positive regulation of mitotic cytokinetic process; positive regulation of protein localization to centrosome; centrosome cycle; mitotic cell cycle; protein heterotrimerization; regulation of glycolytic process; tRNA export from nucleus; protein sumoylation; viral transcription; regulation of gene silencing by miRNA; intracellular transport of virus; regulation of cellular response to heat
Sources:Amigo / QuickGO
Orthologs
Species	Human	Mouse
Entrez	23636	18226
Ensembl	ENSG00000213024	ENSMUSG00000109511
UniProt	P37198	Q63850
RefSeq (mRNA)	NM_153719; NM_001193357; NM_012346; NM_016553; NM_153718	NM_053074
RefSeq (protein)	NP_001180286; NP_036478; NP_057637; NP_714940; NP_714941	NP_444304
Location (UCSC)	Chr 19: 49.91 – 49.93 Mb	Chr 7: 44.47 – 44.48 Mb
PubMed search
- Wikidata
View/Edit Human	View/Edit Mouse

Nuclear pore glycoprotein p62 is a protein complex associated with the nuclear envelope. The p62 protein remains associated with the nuclear pore complex-lamina fraction. p62 is synthesized as a soluble cytoplasmic precursor of 61 kDa followed by modification that involve addition of N-acetylglucosamine residues, followed by association with other complex proteins. In humans it is encoded by the NUP62 gene.

The nuclear pore complex is a massive structure that extends across the nuclear envelope, forming a gateway that regulates the flow of macromolecules between the nucleus and the cytoplasm. Nucleoporins are the main components of the nuclear pore complex in eukaryotic cells. The protein encoded by this gene is a member of the FG repeat containing nucleoporins and is localized to the nuclear pore central plug. This protein associates with the importin alpha/beta complex which is involved in the import of proteins containing nuclear localization signals. Multiple transcript variants of this gene encode a single protein isoform.

== Structure ==
P62 is a serine/threonine rich protein of ~520 amino acids, with tetrapeptide repeats on the amino terminus and a series of alpha-helical regions with hydrophobic heptad repeats forming beta-propeller domain. P62 assembles into a complex containing 3 addition proteins, p60, p54 and p45 forming the p62 complex of ~235 kDa. O-GlcNAcylation appears to be involved in the assembly and disassembly of p62 into higher order complexes, and a serine/threonine rich linker region between Ser270 to Thr294 appear to be regulatory. The p62 complex is localized to both the nucleoplasmic and cytoplasmic sides of the pore complex and the relative diameter of p62 complex relative to the nuclear pore complex suggests it interacts in pore gating.

== Function ==
P62 appears to interact with mRNA during transport out of the nucleus. P62 also interacts with a nuclear transport factor (NTF2) protein that is involved in trafficking proteins between cytoplasm and nucleus. Another protein, importin (beta) binds to the helical rod section of p62, which also binds NTF2 suggesting the formation of a higher order gating complex. Karyopherin beta2 (transportin), a riboprotein transporter also interacts with p62. P62 also interacts with Nup93, and when Nup98 is depleted p62 fails to assemble with nuclear pore complexes. Mutant pores could not dock/transport proteins with nuclear localization signals or M9 import signals.

== Pathology ==
Antibodies to p62 complex are involved in one or more autoimmune diseases. P62 glycosylation is increased in diabetes and may influence its association with other diseases. p62 is also more frequent in Stage IV primary biliary cirrhosis and is prognostic for severe disease.

== Interactions ==
Nucleoporin 62 has been shown to interact with:

- HSF2,
- KPNB1,
- NUTF2,
- TRAF3, and
- XPO1,
- Nup93.
