= INT-777 =

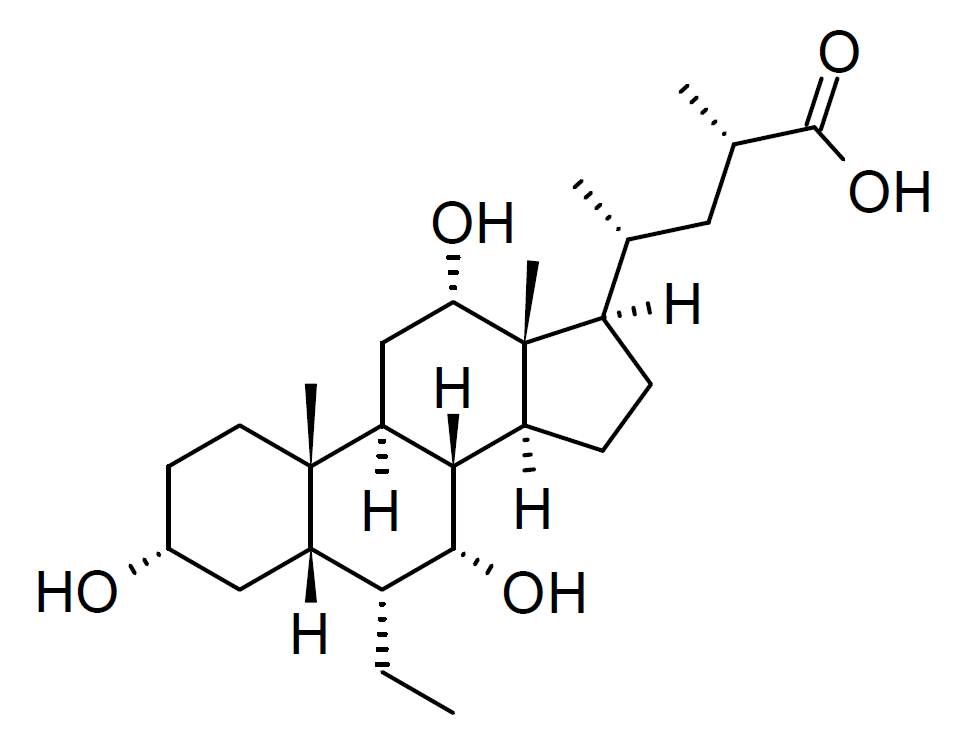

Identifiers
- IUPAC name: (2S,4R)-4-[(3R,5S,6R,7R,8R,9S,10S,12S,13R,14S,17R)-6-ethyl-3,7,12-trihydroxy-10,13-dimethyl-2,3,4,5,6,7,8,9,11,12,14,15,16,17-tetradecahydro-1H-cyclopenta[a]phenanthren-17-yl]-2-methylpentanoic acid
- CAS Number: 1199796-29-6
- PubChem CID: 45483949
- IUPHAR/BPS: 7048
- ChemSpider: 24531963
- UNII: UTD8BCW6B8
- ChEMBL: ChEMBL567640

Chemical and physical data
- Formula: C_{27}H_{46}O_{5}
- Molar mass: 450.660 g·mol^{−1}
- 3D model (JSmol): Interactive image
- SMILES: CC[C@@H]1[C@@H]2C[C@@H](CC[C@@]2([C@H]3C[C@@H]([C@]4([C@H]([C@@H]3[C@@H]1O)CC[C@@H]4[C@H](C)C[C@H](C)C(=O)O)C)O)C)O
- InChI: InChI=1S/C27H46O5/c1-6-17-20-12-16(28)9-10-26(20,4)21-13-22(29)27(5)18(14(2)11-15(3)25(31)32)7-8-19(27)23(21)24(17)30/h14-24,28-30H,6-13H2,1-5H3,(H,31,32)/t14-,15+,16-,17-,18-,19+,20+,21+,22+,23+,24-,26+,27-/m1/s1; Key:NPBCMXATLRCCLF-IRRLEISYSA-N

INT-777 is an experimental drug which acts as a potent and selective agonist for the G protein-coupled bile acid receptor (GPBAR1/TGR5). It has antiinflammatory effects and has been researched for various conditions including diabetes and pulmonary arterial hypertension.
