= HSF4 =

Protein-coding gene in the species Homo sapiens

Identifiers
- Aliases: HSF4, CTM, CTRCT5, heat shock transcription factor 4
- External IDs: OMIM: 602438; MGI: 1347058; GeneCards: HSF4

Gene location (Human)
Chr.	Chromosome 16 (human)
Band	16q22.1	Start	67,164,681 bp
Band	16q22.1	End	67,169,945 bp

Gene location (Mouse)
Chr.	Chromosome 8 (mouse)
Band	8|8 D3	Start	105,996,433 bp
Band	8|8 D3	End	106,002,477 bp
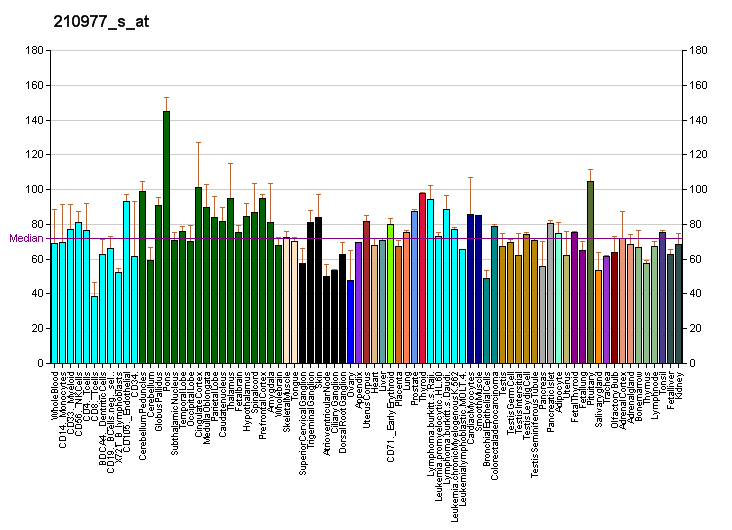
RNA expression pattern
Bgee	Human / Mouse (ortholog); Top expressed in: right hemisphere of cerebellum; anterior pituitary; gastric mucosa; right uterine tube; body of pancreas; apex of heart; canal of the cervix; right ovary; left uterine tube; right frontal lobe / Top expressed in: lens; muscle of thigh; female urethra; superior frontal gyrus; primary visual cortex; cerebellar cortex; central gray substance of midbrain; dentate gyrus of hippocampal formation granule cell; epithelium of lens; lumbar spinal ganglion; More reference expression data
BioGPS	More reference expression data
Gene ontology
Molecular function	sequence-specific DNA binding; DNA binding; transcription corepressor activity; DNA-binding transcription factor activity; protein phosphatase binding; DNA-binding transcription factor activity, RNA polymerase II-specific; RNA polymerase II cis-regulatory region sequence-specific DNA binding
Cellular component	nucleus; nuclear speck
Biological process	eye development; regulation of transcription, DNA-templated; cell development; histone H3-K9 demethylation; negative regulation of transcription by RNA polymerase II; transcription, DNA-templated; protein homotrimerization; positive regulation of cell differentiation; positive regulation of cell population proliferation; camera-type eye development; negative regulation of transcription, DNA-templated; protein homooligomerization; positive regulation of transcription by RNA polymerase II; visual perception; cellular response to heat; positive regulation of transcription from RNA polymerase II promoter in response to heat stress
Sources:Amigo / QuickGO
Orthologs
Databases	NCBI: entry; OMA: entry
Species	Human	Mouse
Entrez	3299	26386
Ensembl	ENSG00000102878	ENSMUSG00000033249
UniProt	Q9ULV5	Q9R0L1
RefSeq (mRNA)	NM_001538; NM_001040667; NM_001374674; NM_001374675	NM_001256042; NM_001256044; NM_011939
RefSeq (protein)	NP_001035757; NP_001529; NP_001361603; NP_001361604	NP_001242971; NP_001242973; NP_036069
Location (UCSC)	Chr 16: 67.16 – 67.17 Mb	Chr 8: 106 – 106 Mb
PubMed search
- Wikidata
View/Edit Human	View/Edit Mouse

Heat shock factor protein 4 is a protein that in humans is encoded by the HSF4 gene.

Heat-shock transcription factors (HSFs) activate heat-shock response genes under conditions of heat or other stresses. HSF4 lacks the carboxyl-terminal hydrophobic repeat which is shared among all vertebrate HSFs and has been suggested to be involved in the negative regulation of DNA binding activity. Two alternatively spliced transcripts encoding distinct isoforms and possessing different transcriptional activity have been described.

== See also ==
- Heat shock factor
