= Heat shock factor =

Transcription factor

HSF-type DNA-binding
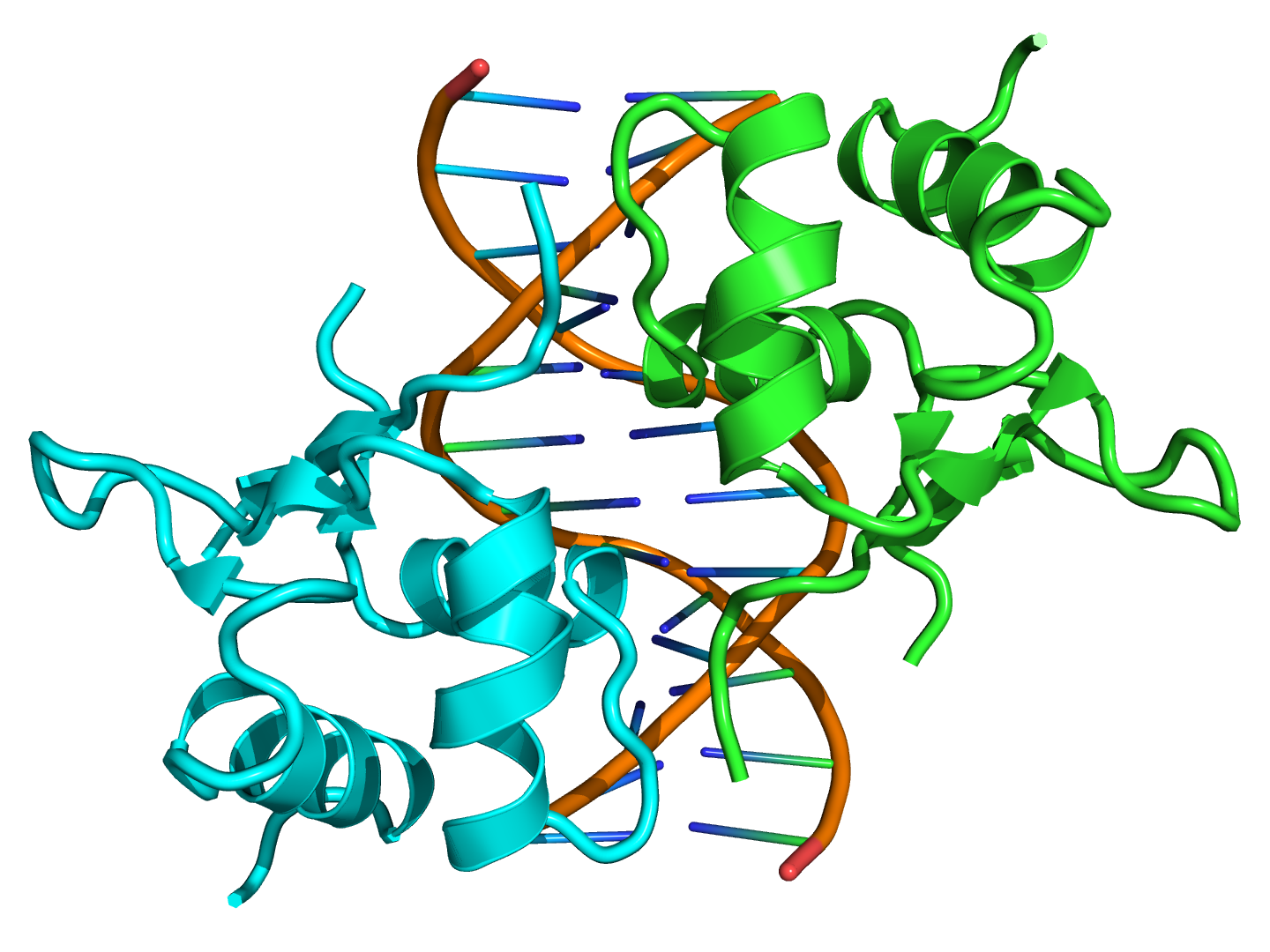
- Structure of the dimeric DNA binding domain of the yeast heat shock factor (cyan and green) bound to DNA (brown) based on PDB: 3HTS.

Identifiers
- Symbol: HSF_DNA-bind
- Pfam: PF00447
- InterPro: IPR000232
- PROSITE: PDOC00381
- SCOP2: 1hks / SCOPe / SUPFAM
Available protein structures:
- PDB: 1FBQ, 1FBS, 1FBU, 1FYK, 1FYL, 1FYM, 1HKS, 1HKT, 2HTS, 3HSF, 3HTS IPR000232 PF00447 (ECOD; PDBsum)
- AlphaFold: IPR000232; PF00447

Vertebrate heat shock transcription factor

Identifiers
- Symbol: Vert_HS_TF
- Pfam: PF06546
- InterPro: IPR010542
Available protein structures:
- PDB: IPR010542 PF06546 (ECOD; PDBsum)
- AlphaFold: IPR010542; PF06546

In molecular biology, heat shock factors (HSF), are the transcription factors that regulate the expression of the heat shock proteins. A typical example is the heat shock factor of Drosophila melanogaster.

== Function ==
Heat shock factors (HSF) are transcriptional activators of heat shock genes. These activators bind specifically to Heat Shock sequence Elements (HSE) throughout the genome whose consensus-sequence is a tandem array of three oppositely oriented "AGAAN" motifs or a degenerate version thereof. Under non-stressed conditions, Drosophila HSF is a nuclear-localized unbound monomer, whereas heat shock activation results in trimerization and binding to the HSE. The Heat Shock sequence Element is highly conserved from yeast to humans.

Heat shock factor 1 (HSF-1) is the major regulator of heat shock protein transcription in eukaryotes. In the absence of cellular stress, HSF-1 is inhibited by association with heat shock proteins and is therefore not active. Cellular stresses, such as increased temperature, can cause proteins in the cell to misfold. Heat shock proteins bind to the misfolded proteins and dissociate from HSF-1. This allows HSF1 to form trimers and translocate to the cell nucleus and activate transcription. Its function is not only critical to overcome the proteotoxic effects of thermal stress, but also needed for proper animal development and the overall survival of cancer cells.

== Structure ==
Each HSF monomer contains one C-terminal and three N-terminal leucine zipper repeats. Point mutations in these regions result in disruption of cellular localisation, rendering the protein constitutively nuclear in humans. Two sequences flanking the N-terminal zippers fit the consensus of a bi-partite nuclear localization signal (NLS). Interaction between the N- and C-terminal zippers may result in a structure that masks the NLS sequences: following activation of HSF, these may then be unmasked, resulting in relocalisation of the protein to the nucleus. The DNA-binding component of HSF lies to the N-terminus of the first NLS region, and is referred to as the HSF domain.

== Isoforms ==
Humans express the following heat shock factors:

gene	protein
HSF1	heat shock transcription factor 1
HSF2	heat shock transcription factor 2
HSF2BP	heat shock transcription factor 2 binding protein
HSF4	heat shock transcription factor 4
HSF5	heat shock transcription factor family member 5
HSFX1	heat shock transcription factor family, X linked 1
HSFX2	heat shock transcription factor family, X linked 2
HSFY1	heat shock transcription factor, Y-linked 1
HSFY2	heat shock transcription factor, Y-linked 2

== See also ==
- Cold-shock domain
