= SBI-115 =

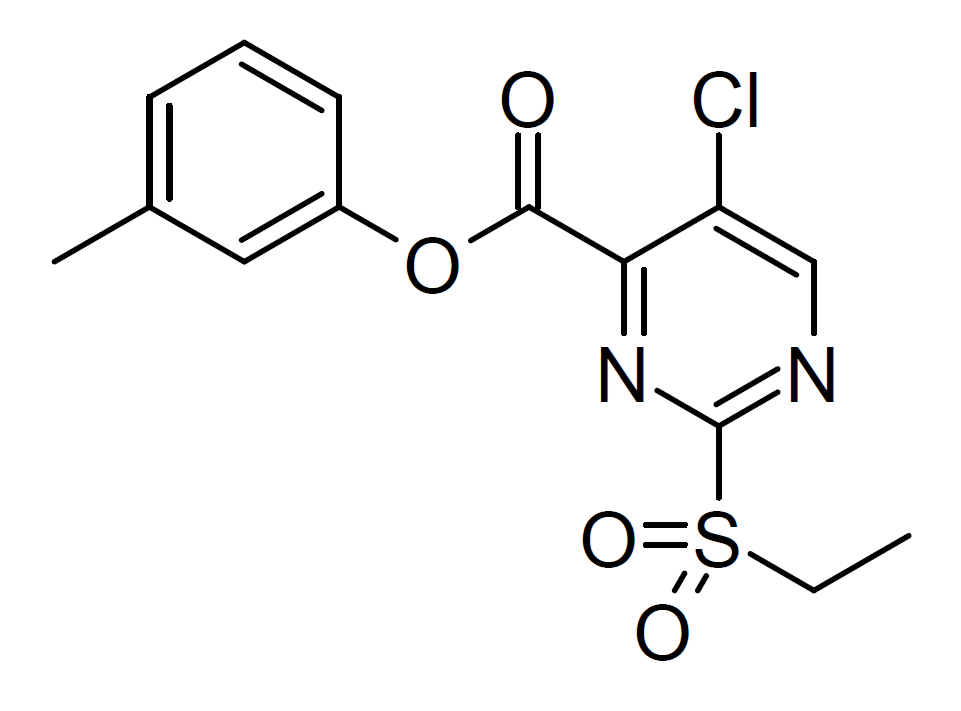

Identifiers
- IUPAC name: (3-methylphenyl) 5-chloro-2-ethylsulfonylpyrimidine-4-carboxylate
- CAS Number: 882366-16-7
- PubChem CID: 18879973
- ChemSpider: 11981745

Chemical and physical data
- Formula: C_{14}H_{13}ClN_{2}O_{4}S
- Molar mass: 340.78 g·mol^{−1}
- 3D model (JSmol): Interactive image
- SMILES: CCS(=O)(=O)C1=NC=C(C(=N1)C(=O)OC2=CC=CC(=C2)C)Cl
- InChI: InChI=1S/C14H13ClN2O4S/c1-3-22(19,20)14-16-8-11(15)12(17-14)13(18)21-10-6-4-5-9(2)7-10/h4-8H,3H2,1-2H3; Key:IJPXOPBVXVPPEW-UHFFFAOYSA-N

SBI-115 is an experimental drug which acts as a potent and selective antagonist for the G protein-coupled bile acid receptor (GPBAR1/TGR5). It is used for studying the function of this receptor, and has been found to show beneficial effects in animal models of polycystic liver disease as well as some forms of cancer.
