= Anti-glutamate receptor antibodies =

Type of autoantibody

Anti-glutamate receptor antibodies are autoantibodies detected in serum and/or cerebrospinal fluid samples of a variety of disorders such as encephalitis, epilepsy and ataxia. Clinical and experimental studies starting around the year 2000 suggest that these antibodies are not simply epiphenomena and are involved in autoimmune disease pathogenesis.

== Anti-AMPAr ==
The first anti-glutamate receptor antibody was shown by McNamara JO and colleagues to be directed against the GluR3 subunit of the alpha-amino-3-hydroxy-5-methylisoxazole-4-propionic acid (AMPA) receptor. Since then anti-GluR3 antibodies have been demonstrated in temporal lobe epilepsy, epilepsia partialis continua and focal epilepsy.

== Anti-NMDAr ==
The second large group of anti-glutamate receptor antibodies is associated with different subunits of the N-methyl-D-aspartate (NMDA) receptor. Patients with limbic encephalitis, encephalitis, systemic lupus erythematosus, ataxia and epilepsia partialis continua may present with serum and cerebrospinal fluid antibodies to the delta2 or NR2 subunits of the NMDA receptor.

Antibodies against the NR1, NR2A and NR2B subunits of the NMDA receptor were described by Josep Dalmau, Erdem Tüzün and colleagues in women presenting with psychiatric symptoms, amnesia, seizures, dyskinesias, autonomic dysfunction and loss of consciousness. So far, these antibodies appear to be associated with an accompanying ovarian or mediastinal teratoma expressing NMDA receptors. Notably, this is the second neuronal cell surface antigen (after anti-voltage-gated potassium channel (VGKC) antibodies described by Angela Vincent and colleagues) associated with autoimmune encephalitis.

== Anti-mGluR ==
Additionally, antibodies to the mGluR1 subunit of the metabotropic glutamate receptor 1 have been shown in a small group of ataxia patients. Anti-glutamate receptor antibodies are also detected in various non-immunological neurological diseases such as stroke and trauma.
