= TC-G 1005 =

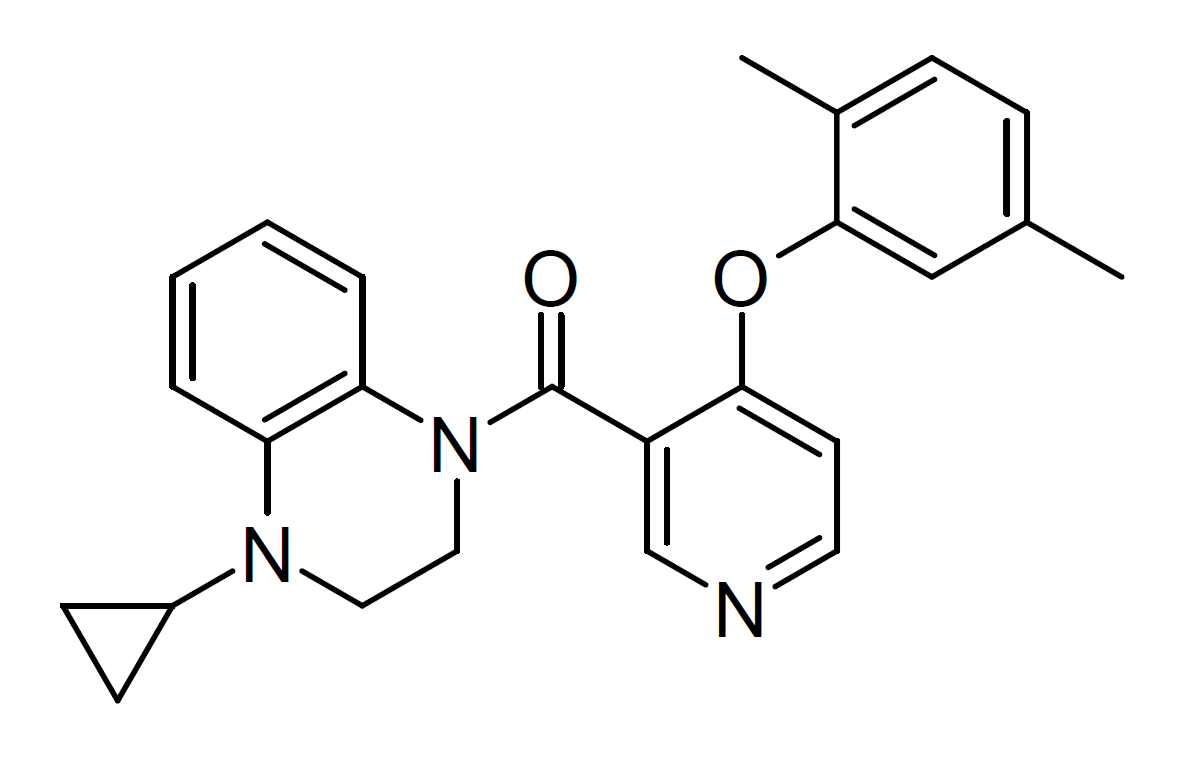

Identifiers
- IUPAC name: (4-cyclopropyl-2,3-dihydroquinoxalin-1-yl)-[4-(2,5-dimethylphenoxy)pyridin-3-yl]methanone
- CAS Number: 1415407-60-1
- PubChem CID: 71450251
- ChemSpider: 28663072
- ChEMBL: ChEMBL2181226

Chemical and physical data
- Formula: C_{25}H_{25}N_{3}O_{2}
- Molar mass: 399.494 g·mol^{−1}
- 3D model (JSmol): Interactive image
- SMILES: CC1=CC(=C(C=C1)C)OC2=C(C=NC=C2)C(=O)N3CCN(C4=CC=CC=C43)C5CC5
- InChI: InChI=1S/C25H25N3O2/c1-17-7-8-18(2)24(15-17)30-23-11-12-26-16-20(23)25(29)28-14-13-27(19-9-10-19)21-5-3-4-6-22(21)28/h3-8,11-12,15-16,19H,9-10,13-14H2,1-2H3; Key:JQULIQJSYPZQMA-UHFFFAOYSA-N

TC-G 1005 is an experimental drug which acts as a potent and selective agonist for the G protein-coupled bile acid receptor (GPBAR1/TGR5). It is used for studying the function of this receptor, and has been found to induce secretion of glucagon-like peptide-1 and reduce blood glucose levels.
