= HSF2 =

Protein-coding gene in the species Homo sapiens

Identifiers
- Aliases: HSF2, HSF 2, HSTF 2, heat shock transcription factor 2
- External IDs: OMIM: 140581; MGI: 96239; GeneCards: HSF2
Available structures
PDB	Ortholog search: PDBe RCSB
PDB	List of PDB id codes 5D8K, 5D8L

Gene location (Human)
Chr.	Chromosome 6 (human)
Band	6q22.31	Start	122,399,551 bp
Band	6q22.31	End	122,433,119 bp

Gene location (Mouse)
Chr.	Chromosome 10 (mouse)
Band	10|10 B4	Start	57,362,481 bp
Band	10|10 B4	End	57,389,231 bp
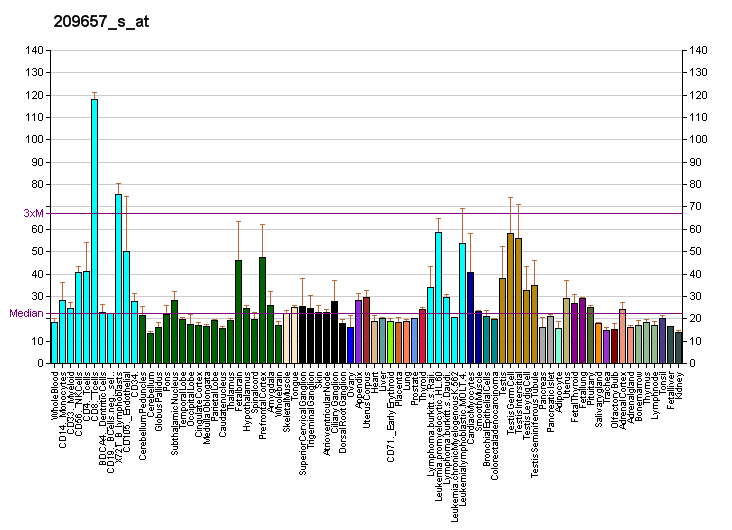

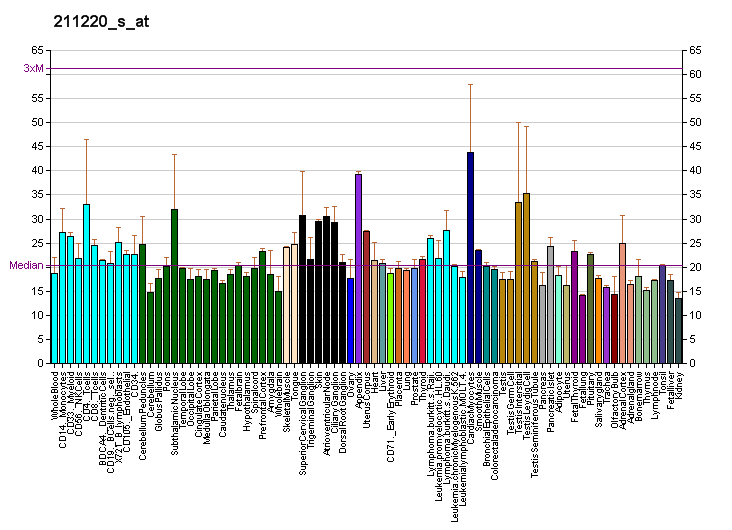
RNA expression pattern
Bgee	Human / Mouse (ortholog); Top expressed in: testicle; Skeletal muscle tissue of biceps brachii; muscle of leg; gastrocnemius muscle; muscle of thigh; ganglionic eminence; gonad; Skeletal muscle tissue of rectus abdominis; Achilles tendon; bronchial epithelial cell / Top expressed in: spermatid; genital tubercle; tail of embryo; ventricular zone; muscle of thigh; neural layer of retina; morula; spermatocyte; embryo; superior frontal gyrus; More reference expression data
BioGPS	More reference expression data
Gene ontology
Molecular function	protein binding; DNA-binding transcription factor activity; RNA polymerase II intronic transcription regulatory region sequence-specific DNA binding; RNA polymerase II transcription regulatory region sequence-specific DNA binding; DNA binding; sequence-specific DNA binding; protein homodimerization activity; DNA-binding transcription activator activity, RNA polymerase II-specific; transcription coactivator activity; RNA polymerase II cis-regulatory region sequence-specific DNA binding; DNA-binding transcription factor activity, RNA polymerase II-specific
Cellular component	nucleus; cytoplasm; nucleoplasm
Biological process	regulation of transcription, DNA-templated; positive regulation of transcription by RNA polymerase II; transcription by RNA polymerase II; spermatogenesis; regulation of transcription by RNA polymerase II; transcription, DNA-templated; cellular response to heat; positive regulation of transcription from RNA polymerase II promoter in response to heat stress
Sources:Amigo / QuickGO
Orthologs
Databases	NCBI: entry; OMA: entry
Species	Human	Mouse
Entrez	3298	15500
Ensembl	ENSG00000025156	ENSMUSG00000019878
UniProt	Q03933; Q9BS48	P38533
RefSeq (mRNA)	NM_004506; NM_001135564; NM_001243094	NM_008297
RefSeq (protein)	NP_001129036; NP_001230023; NP_004497; NP_001230023.1	NP_032323
Location (UCSC)	Chr 6: 122.4 – 122.43 Mb	Chr 10: 57.36 – 57.39 Mb
PubMed search
- Wikidata
View/Edit Human	View/Edit Mouse

Heat shock factor protein 2 is a protein that in humans is encoded by the HSF2 gene.

== Function ==
HSF2, as well as the related gene HSF1, encodes a protein that binds specifically to the heat-shock element and has homology to HSFs of other species. Heat shock transcription factors activate heat-shock response genes under conditions of heat or other stresses. Although the names HSF1 and HSF2 were chosen for historical reasons, these peptides should be referred to as heat-shock transcription factors.

== Interactions ==
HSF2 has been shown to interact with Nucleoporin 62 and HSF1.

== See also ==
- Heat shock factor
