= Paraneoplastic cerebellar degeneration =

- Specialty: Neurology

Paraneoplastic cerebellar degeneration (PCD) is a paraneoplastic syndrome associated with a broad variety of tumors including lung cancer, ovarian cancer, breast cancer, Hodgkin’s lymphoma and others. PCD is a rare condition that occurs in less than 1% of cancer patients.

As is the case with other paraneoplastic syndromes, PCD is believed to be due to an autoimmune reaction targeted against components of the central nervous system, mostly to Purkinje cells.

It is thought to be triggered when tumor cells (in PCD, most commonly ovarian or breast cancer) ectopically express proteins normally expressed in the cerebellum. This is believed to trigger an anti-tumor immune response that may be clinically significant, but also an anti-neural immune response. A broad spectrum of neuronal and glial proteins has been identified as target antigens in PCD.

== Presentation ==
Neurological symptoms may include, among others, dysarthria, truncal, limb and gait ataxia and nystagmus. Symptoms often develop subacutely and progress rapidly over a period of weeks or months to a plateau period that can last for months to years and which often reflects complete loss of Purkinje cells.

== Pathophysiology ==
The anti-Purkinje cell antibodies originally described in PCD led to the hypothesis that the antibody might be pathogenic, much as earlier studies had demonstrated pathogenicity of anti-acetylcholine receptor antibodies in myasthenia gravis. However, when the antibody was used to clone the cDNA encoding the cdr2 antigen, it was found to be an intracellular protein. This led to the suggestion that there might be a cell-mediated component (T cell) in disease pathogenesis. cdr2 antigen-specific CD8+ T cells were subsequently described in more anti-Yo-positive PCD patients. These T cells are likely components in both the anti-tumor immune response and in the neuronal degeneration.

== Diagnosis ==
Of particular note, PCD symptoms precede the diagnosis of the underlying cancer in the majority of cases, and often present insidiously and progress rapidly for weeks to months to a severely disabled state followed by a variable plateau period that can last for months to years. Therefore, newly developing cerebellar ataxia should always prompt proper diagnostic measures to exclude PCD.

== Treatment ==
Tumor removal is still the therapeutic mainstay with very early treatment being essential to prevent irreversible neuronal loss. Immunosuppressive or immunomodulatory treatments are often ineffective. There may be a role for high-dose gammaglobulin therapy in the treatment of PCD, but due to the rare occurrence of this disease, controlled trials of this therapy may be difficult.
