= Nucleoporin 93 =

Protein-coding gene in the species Homo sapiens

NUP93

Identifiers
- Aliases: NUP93, NIC96, NPHS12, nucleoporin 93kDa, nucleoporin 93
- External IDs: OMIM: 614351; MGI: 1919055; GeneCards: NUP93
Available structures
PDB	Ortholog search: PDBe RCSB
PDB	List of PDB id codes 5IJN, 5IJO

Gene location (Human)
Chr.	Chromosome 16 (human)
Band	16q13	Start	56,730,118 bp
Band	16q13	End	56,850,286 bp

Gene location (Mouse)
Chr.	Chromosome 8 (mouse)
Band	8|8 C5	Start	94,941,192 bp
Band	8|8 C5	End	95,043,855 bp
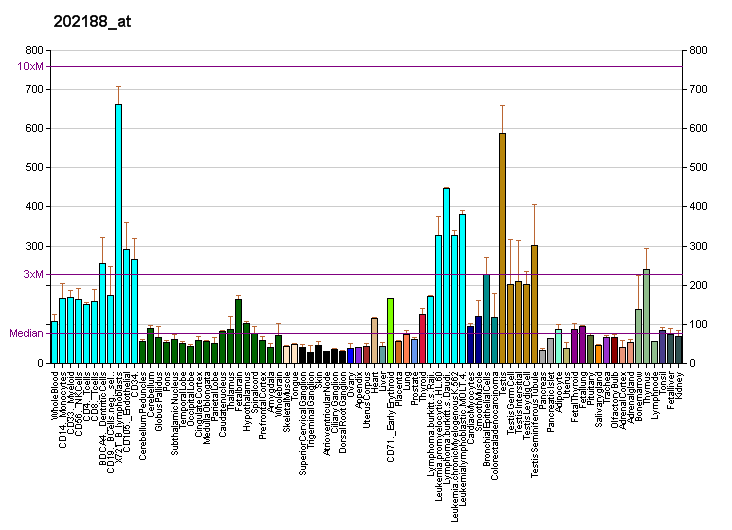
RNA expression pattern
Bgee	Human / Mouse (ortholog); Top expressed in: ventricular zone; ganglionic eminence; left lobe of thyroid gland; gonad; right lobe of thyroid gland; right testis; left testis; testicle; oocyte; granulocyte / Top expressed in: somite; zygote; yolk sac; mandibular prominence; primitive streak; epiblast; maxillary prominence; abdominal wall; secondary oocyte; tail of embryo; More reference expression data
BioGPS	More reference expression data
Gene ontology
Molecular function	structural constituent of nuclear pore; protein binding
Cellular component	nuclear membrane; membrane; nuclear periphery; nuclear pore; nucleus; nuclear envelope; host cell
Biological process	mRNA transport; viral transcription; protein sumoylation; mitotic nuclear membrane disassembly; regulation of cellular response to heat; protein transport; viral process; intracellular transport of virus; nuclear pore complex assembly; negative regulation of hydrogen peroxide-induced cell death; tRNA export from nucleus; glomerular visceral epithelial cell migration; nuclear envelope organization; mRNA export from nucleus; renal system development; positive regulation of SMAD protein signal transduction; SMAD protein signal transduction; glomerular visceral epithelial cell development; regulation of gene silencing by miRNA; poly(A)+ mRNA export from nucleus; regulation of glycolytic process; transport; protein import into nucleus; nucleocytoplasmic transport
Sources:Amigo / QuickGO
Orthologs
Databases	NCBI: entry; OMA: entry
Species	Human	Mouse
Entrez	9688	71805
Ensembl	ENSG00000102900	ENSMUSG00000032939
UniProt	Q8N1F7	Q8BJ71
RefSeq (mRNA)	NM_001242795; NM_001242796; NM_014669	NM_172410; NM_001357266; NM_001357267; NM_001357268
RefSeq (protein)	NP_001229724; NP_001229725; NP_055484	NP_765998; NP_001344195; NP_001344196; NP_001344197
Location (UCSC)	Chr 16: 56.73 – 56.85 Mb	Chr 8: 94.94 – 95.04 Mb
PubMed search
- Wikidata
View/Edit Human	View/Edit Mouse

Nucleoporin 93 (Nup93) is a protein that in humans is encoded by the NUP93 gene.
