= G protein-coupled bile acid receptor =

Protein found in humans

GPBAR1

Identifiers
- Aliases: GPBAR1, BG37, GPCR19, GPR131, M-BAR, TGR5, G protein-coupled bile acid receptor, G protein-coupled bile acid receptor 1
- External IDs: OMIM: 610147; MGI: 2653863; GeneCards: GPBAR1

Gene location (Human)
Chr.	Chromosome 2 (human)
Band	2q35	Start	218,259,496 bp
Band	2q35	End	218,263,861 bp

Gene location (Mouse)
Chr.	Chromosome 1 (mouse)
Band	1 C3|1 38.53 cM	Start	74,317,709 bp
Band	1 C3|1 38.53 cM	End	74,318,783 bp
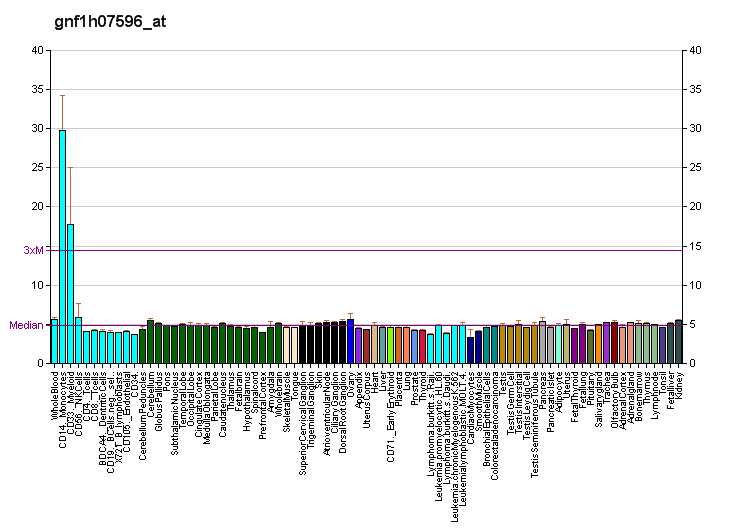
RNA expression pattern
Bgee	Human / Mouse (ortholog); Top expressed in: testicle; monocyte; granulocyte; decidua; gallbladder; blood; subcutaneous adipose tissue; apex of heart; spleen; gastric mucosa / Top expressed in: blastocyst; embryo; embryo; yolk sac; urinary bladder; placenta; intestine; ileum; zygote; duodenum; More reference expression data
BioGPS	More reference expression data
Gene ontology
Molecular function	bile acid receptor activity; G protein-coupled receptor activity; G protein-coupled bile acid receptor activity; signal transducer activity
Cellular component	cytoplasm; integral component of membrane; plasma membrane; membrane
Biological process	signal transduction; cell surface bile acid receptor signaling pathway; regulation of bicellular tight junction assembly; G protein-coupled receptor signaling pathway
Sources:Amigo / QuickGO
Orthologs
Databases	NCBI: entry; OMA: entry
Species	Human	Mouse
Entrez	151306	227289
Ensembl	ENSG00000179921	ENSMUSG00000064272
UniProt	Q8TDU6	Q80SS6
RefSeq (mRNA)	NM_001077191; NM_001077194; NM_170699; NM_001321950	NM_174985
RefSeq (protein)	NP_001070659; NP_001070662; NP_001308879; NP_733800	NP_778150
Location (UCSC)	Chr 2: 218.26 – 218.26 Mb	Chr 1: 74.32 – 74.32 Mb
PubMed search
- Wikidata
View/Edit Human	View/Edit Mouse

The G protein-coupled bile acid receptor 1 (GPBAR1) also known as G-protein coupled receptor 19 (GPCR19), membrane-type receptor for bile acids (M-BAR) or Takeda G protein-coupled receptor 5 (TGR5) is a protein that in humans is encoded by the GPBAR1 gene. Activated by bile acids, these receptors play a crucial role in metabolic regulation, including insulin secretion and energy balance, and are found in the gastrointestinal tract as well as other tissues throughout the body.

== History ==
TGR5 receptors were first discovered by Takaharu Maruyama in 2002. It was the first membrane bound G protein coupled receptor that was discovered for faster bile acid signaling. Initially, up until the late 1990s, bile acids were known only for its metabolic function of emulsifying fats and keeping cholesterol homeostasis. It was not until 1999 when researchers began exploring into its role as a hormone and signaling molecule with the discovery of the nuclear bile acid receptors, Farnesoid X receptors (FXR).

== Location ==
TGR5 receptors are primarily located in gastrointestinal tracts where bile acid functions are most prevalent. They can also be found throughout the body, including the nervous system, immune system, and various muscle groups, aiding in the tasks that are relevant to their respective locations.

== Function ==
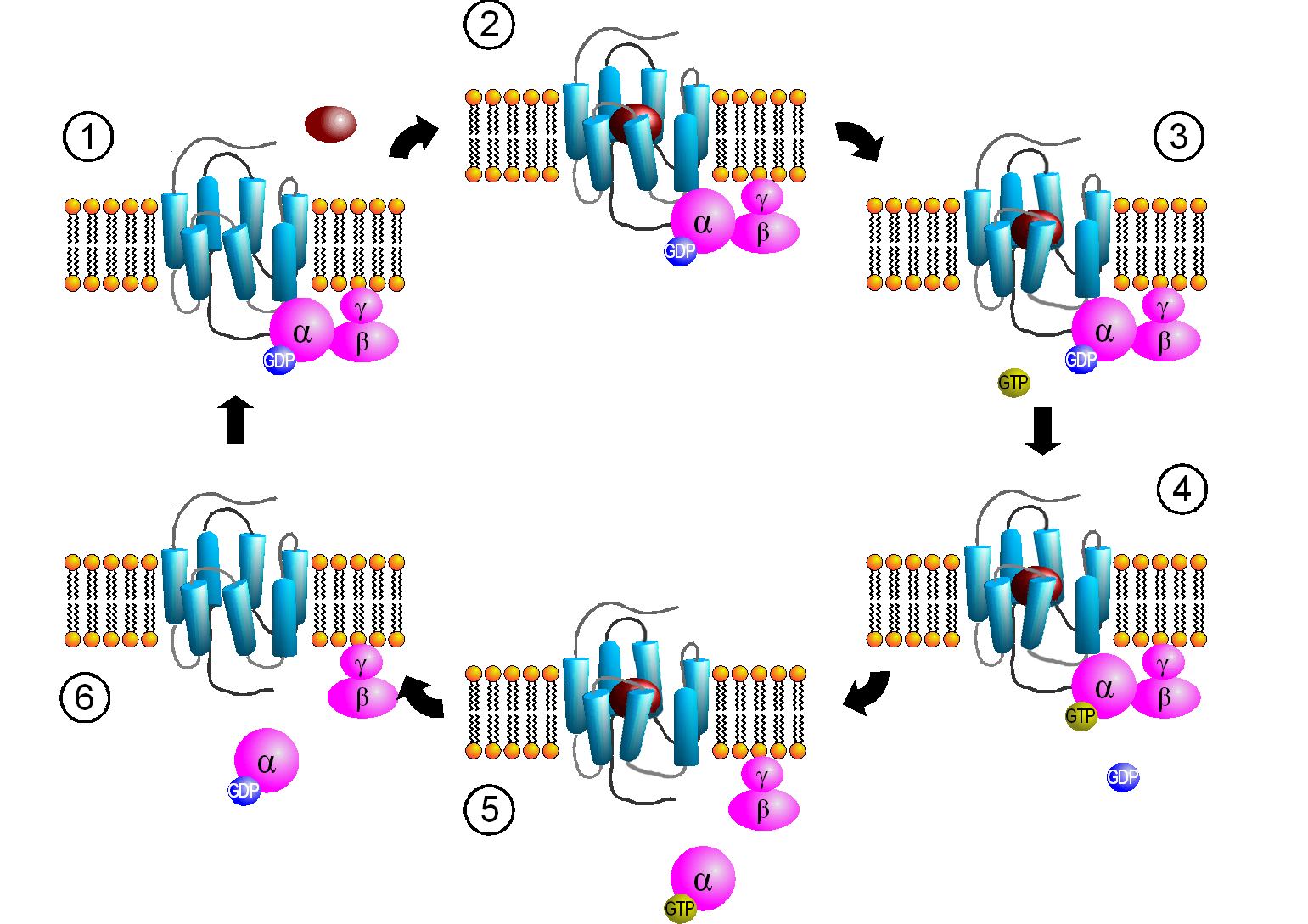
G-Protein Coupled Receptor working mechanism. The binding of an antagonist to the receptor binding cite, causes an exchange of the GDP, bound to the alpha subunit, with GTP. This activates the subunit allowing it to dissociate from its counterpart, the beta-gama subunit. These separated subunits go on to independently activate other second messenger systems like the cAMP which is activated by the alpha subunit acting on adenylyl cyclase. The GTP on the alpha subunit hydrolyzes back to GDP, allowing its re-association with the beta-gamma subunit.

The primary function of the TGR5 receptor is for the binding of bile acid to elicit second messenger systems in the metabolic role of bile acids. It is also a receptor for other agonists, including activating various other pathways responsible for responses like inflammation.

TGR5 receptors are a member of the G protein-coupled receptor (GPCR) superfamily. As mentioned, this protein functions as a cell surface receptor for bile acids. Treatment of cells expressing this GPCR with bile acids induces the production of intracellular cAMP, activation of a MAP kinase signaling pathway, and internalization of the receptor. The receptor is implicated in the suppression of macrophage functions and regulation of energy homeostasis by bile acids.

One effect of this receptor is to activate deiodinases which convert the prohormone thyroxine (T_{4}) to the active hormone triiodothyronine (T_{3}). T_{3} in turn activates the thyroid hormone receptor which increases metabolic rate.

=== Bile acid effects on TGR5 ===
Bile acid binds to the TGR5 receptor which increases the secretion of GLP-1. GLP-1 increases glucose-induced insulin secretion, satiety, and pancreatic beta cell production (responsible for insulin secretion). GLP-1 is also used in medications to treat type 2 diabetes.

GLP-1 undergoes heightened production through 2 pathways. The first pathway is the activation of adenylyl cyclase and cAMP which begins a secondary messenger cascade to release GLP-1. The second pathway entails the increase in mitochondrial activity in response to nutrients like glucose and fatty acids which causes an increase in the ATP to ADP ratio. This leads to the inactivation of ATP-sensitive potassium channels that causes the cell membrane to depolarize. This depolarization causes an increase in voltage-gated calcium channel activity, sending a flood of calcium ions which triggers a cascade of events leading to increased GLP-1 secretion.

==== Extraintestinal activation of TGR5 receptors by bile acids ====
Bile acid's ability to act as an antagonist for TGR5 receptors located outside of the gastrointestinal tract means it has the ability to escape the tract and travel to these various regions. Primary bile acids are synthesized by hepatocytes in the liver and get conjugated with taurine or glycine before they are stored in the gall bladder for stimulated secretion. Upon the presence of fats and proteins in the duodenum from the diet, these primary bile acids get secreted into the intestine where they are converted into secondary bile acids. 95% of these bile acids get reabsorbed into the liver for recirculation, of which 10% escapes this enterohepatic circulation and enters the systemic circulation. It is through their presence in the serum that they are able to get to various other organs where transporters and channels located at their membranes and barriers allow them to access the TGR5 receptors.

== Ligands ==
Agonists

- INT-777
- TC-G 1005

Antagonists

- SBI-115
