= Anti-mitochondrial antibody =

Autoantibodies against liver mitochondria, indicating primary biliary cholangitis

Anti-mitochondrial antibodies (AMA) are autoantibodies, consisting of immunoglobulins formed against mitochondria, primarily the mitochondria in cells of the liver.

The presence of AMA in the blood or serum of a person may be indicative of the presence of, or the potential to develop, the autoimmune disease primary biliary cholangitis (PBC; previously known as primary biliary cirrhosis). PBC causes scarring of liver tissue, confined primarily to the bile duct drainage system. AMA is present in about 95% of cases. PBC is seen primarily in middle-aged women, and in those afflicted with other autoimmune diseases.

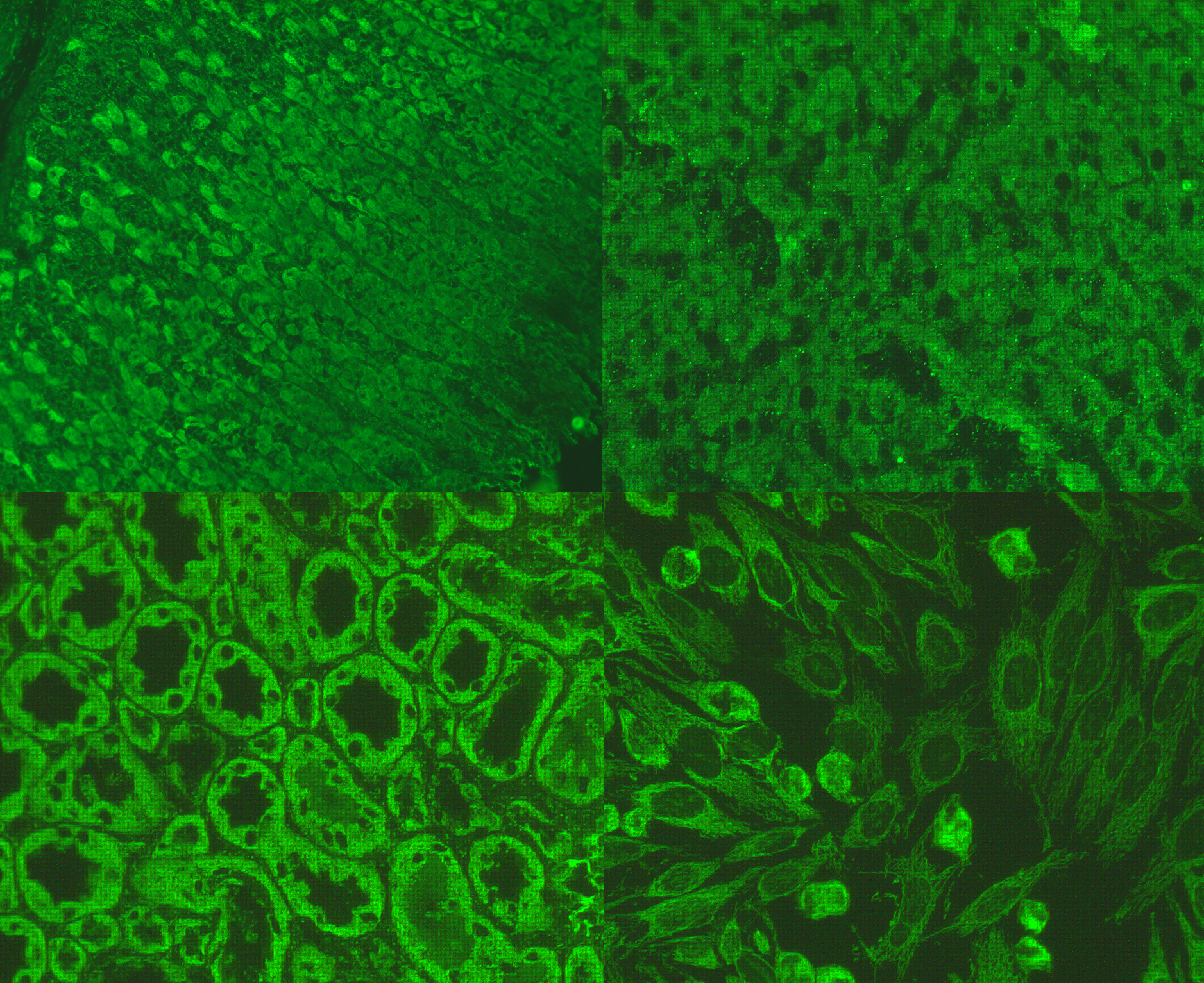
Immunofluorescence staining pattern of AMA shown on stomach (top left), liver (top right), kidney (bottom left) and hep-20-10 cells (bottom right).

== Antigens ==
Several of the antigens associated with anti-mitochondrial antibodies have been identified.

- M1 – cardiolipin (Anti-cardiolipin antibodies, ACA)
- M2 – branched-chain alpha-keto acid dehydrogenase complex
- M3 – outer mitochondrial membrane
- M4 – sulfite oxidase
- M5 – outer mitochondrial membrane
- M6 – outer mitochondrial membrane
- M7 – sarcosine dehydrogenase
- M8 – outer mitochondrial membrane
- M9 – glycogen phosphorylase

== Disease associations ==
Antibodies to these specific antigens have been associated with a number of conditions: anti M2, M4, M8, and M9 are associated with primary biliary cholangitis; M2 – autoimmune hepatitis; M1 – syphilis; M3 – drug-induced lupus erythematosus; M6 – drug-induced hepatitis; M7 – cardiomyopathy, myocarditis; M5 – systemic lupus erythematosus and undifferentiated collagenosis, autoimmune haemolytic anaemia. These associations are not completely specific and should not be relied upon solely for diagnosis.

Antimitochondrial antibodies can also be detected in Sjögren's syndrome, systemic sclerosis, asymptomatic recurrent bacteriuria in women, pulmonary tuberculosis, and leprosy.

Anti-cardiolipin antibodies are another type of AMA, and cardiolipin is found on the inner mitochondrial membrane.

== Development ==
A cause of AMA has been postulated to be that xenobiotic-induced and/or oxidative modification of mitochondrial autoantigens is a critical step leading to loss of tolerance. In acute liver failure AMA are found against all major liver antigens.

- Pyruvate dehydrogenase, E2 subunits
- 2-Oxo-glutarate dehydrogenase
- Branched-chain 2-oxo-acid dehydrogenase

Around 40.5% of acute liver failure patients were found to have elevated AMA, although a larger proportion (56.9%) had anti-transglutaminase antibodies, usually associated with coeliac disease.

== See also ==
- Antibodies
- Mitochondrion
