= Anti-p62 antibodies =

Autoantibody
Anti-p62
Autoantigen; Isoform	Nucleoporin 62kDA
Autoantigen gene	NUP62
Affected organ(s)	Bile duct
Associated; Disease(s)	Primary biliary cirrhosis
HLA associations	DR2 (weak)

Anti-p62 antibodies (AP62A) are found in a primary biliary cirrhosis. The p62 protein is also more frequent in Stage IV primary biliary cirrhosis and is prognostic for severe disease. The autoantigen is the nucleoporin 62kDA protein.
