= FAM107B =

Protein-coding gene in the species Homo sapiens

Identifiers
- Aliases: FAM107B, C10orf45, family with sequence similarity 107 member B, HITS
- External IDs: MGI: 1913790; HomoloGene: 75316; GeneCards: FAM107B; OMA:FAM107B - orthologs

Gene location (Human)
Chr.	Chromosome 10 (human)
Band	10p13	Start	14,518,557 bp
Band	10p13	End	14,774,897 bp

Gene location (Mouse)
Chr.	Chromosome 2 (mouse)
Band	2|2 A1	Start	3,571,525 bp
Band	2|2 A1	End	3,783,179 bp
RNA expression pattern
Bgee	Human / Mouse (ortholog); Top expressed in: corpus callosum; nasal epithelium; inferior ganglion of vagus nerve; renal medulla; mucosa of ileum; bone marrow; trachea; Medulla Oblongata; olfactory zone of nasal mucosa; pancreatic ductal cell / Top expressed in: granulocyte; retinal pigment epithelium; ciliary body; zygote; endothelial cell of lymphatic vessel; epithelium of lens; secondary oocyte; Epithelium of choroid plexus; tibiofemoral joint; lacrimal gland; More reference expression data
BioGPS	n/a
Orthologs
Species	Human	Mouse
Entrez	83641	66540
Ensembl	ENSG00000065809	ENSMUSG00000026655
UniProt	Q9H098	Q3TGF2
RefSeq (mRNA)	NM_001282695; NM_001282696; NM_001282697; NM_001282698; NM_001282699 NM_001282700; NM_001282701; NM_001282702; NM_001282703; NM_031453; NM_001320735; NM_001320736; NM_001320737; NM_001320738; NM_001320739; NM_001320740; NM_001320741	NM_025626
RefSeq (protein)	NP_001269624; NP_001269625; NP_001269626; NP_001269627; NP_001269628 NP_001269629; NP_001269630; NP_001269631; NP_001269632; NP_001307664; NP_001307665; NP_001307666; NP_001307667; NP_001307668; NP_001307669; NP_001307670; NP_113641	NP_079902
Location (UCSC)	Chr 10: 14.52 – 14.77 Mb	Chr 2: 3.57 – 3.78 Mb
PubMed search
- Wikidata
View/Edit Human	View/Edit Mouse

FAM107B is a gene found in humans. It is located on the minus strand of chromosome 10, p13, which is on the short arm of the chromosome. It has other alias names, such as C10orf45, FLJ45505, MGC11034 and MGC90261. The gene contains a conserved domain, DUF1151, which is a family that consists of several eukaryotic proteins of unknown function. FAM107B is expressed in most tissues in the human body without there being a high frequency in any one tissue. It is found in all stages of human development.

== Gene ==
The mRNA for FAM107B is 3785 base pairs long and contains five exons. The protein for FAM107B is known as LOC83641. It is 306 amino acids long. According to AceView, there are 27 spliced variants with 2 unspliced variants and 27 mRNAs of FAM107B. Of these variants and mRNAs, only 23 spliced and unspliced mRNAs are known to encode proteins of quality. Additionally, there appear to be 17 different isoforms. FAM107B is not a signal peptide, but is thought to be a protein that is exported to the mitochondria. It has the following genes located in its gene neighborhood: FRMD4A (FERM domain containing 4A); LOC100289125 (hypothetical protein LOC100289125); RPSAP7 (ribosomal protein SA pseudogene 7 in Homo sapiens); CDNF (cerebral dopamine neurotrophic factor; HSPA14.

FAM107B has one paralog, FAM107A, and many orthologs in organisms including primates, dogs, cows, mice, and chickens. With these orthologs, there is a high degree of conservation.

== Structure ==
Two structures have a high similarity to that of FAM107B: that of a human septin trimer in Homo sapiens and that of the 3rd HMG-box of mouse UBF1. The septin trimer is that of a Ras-like GTPase superfamily whose members are known to regulate cytoskeletal reorganization, gene expression, vesicle trafficking, nucleocytoplasmic transport, and microtubule organization. The 3rd HMG-box of Mouse Ubf is part of the HMG-box superfamily whose members bind to DNA to bend or distort it where it can cause looping of linear DNA, create four-way DNA junctions, and DNA bulges. Members of this family also include mitochondrial transcription factors that bind at four-way DNA junctions.

== Interacting proteins ==
Proteins exist that interact with the FAM107B protein:

- autophagy proteins that are involved in the transport from the cytoplasm to the vacuole, and specifically Cvt vesicle formation;
- the probable protein kinase, which is a heat shock-like protein as well as an antigen;
- the kinesin-related protein which is a biliary glycoprotein isoantigen;
- the hypothetical protein HP0231, which is a somatostatin receptor, as well as the ISWI complex protein 2, which is a mitochondrial reverse transcriptose-like protein;
- the CG7077-PA open reading frame protein, which is known for the Alu repetitive sequence.
