= Henri Parinaud =

French ophthalmologist and neurologist

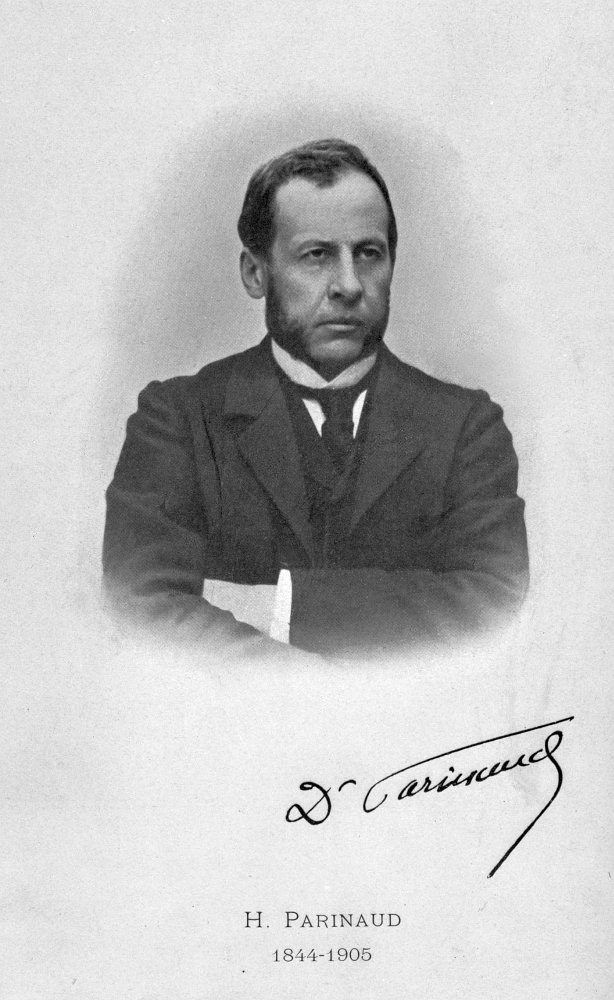
Henri Parinaud

Henri Parinaud (1 May 1844 – 23 March 1905) was a French ophthalmologist and neurologist, most noted for his work in the field of neuro-ophthalmology.

== Early life ==
Henri Parinaud was born in Bellac into a lower-class family in 1844, and his father died when Henri was 19. He went on to study medicine at Limoges, and then in Paris in 1869. When the Franco-Prussian War broke out in 1870, he went to serve as a doctor with the Red Cross, where he earned a medal for Unusual Bravery.

== Medical career ==
After the war, Parinaud returned to Paris to continue his studies. His thesis for medical school was on optic neuritis in acute meningitis in children, which earned him respect and recognition in the field. His other fields of work included multiple sclerosis, ophthalmoplegic migraine, hysteria, supranuclear lesions, and concomitant squint; all in the realm of neurology. Parinaud also worked in the physiology of vision, where he worked on role of the visual receptors, the light sense, night-blindness, and color vision.

Parinaud died in Paris.

== Associated terms ==
He is well known for the medical term Parinaud's syndrome, which is, "a dorsal midbrain lesion such as pinealoma which results in vertical gaze palsy, convergence-retraction nystagmus and light-near dissociation". Another medical condition named after him is Parinaud's oculoglandular syndrome (fever, papillar conjunctivitis and lymphadenopathy), a rare manifestation of cat scratch disease (caused by the bacteria Bartonella), which he was first to describe.

== See also ==
- A Clinical Lesson at the Salpêtrière – 1887 group tableau portrait by André Brouillet
- Cat scratch fever – Bacterial infection from a cat
