= Dieterle stain =

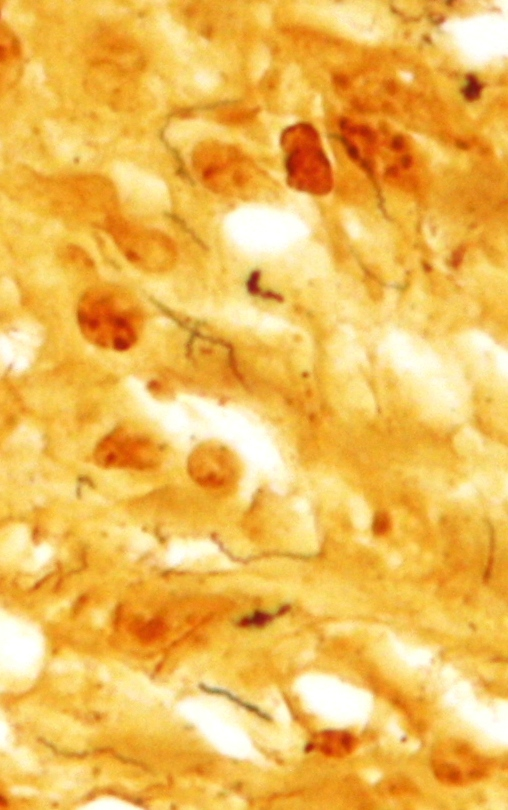
Dieterle stain showing Treponema pallidum(in black), the organism that causes syphilis.

The Dieterle stain is a way of marking tissue for microscopic examination. The key reagent of Dieterle stain is silver nitrate. It can stain microbes like Treponema pallidum in grey or black and background in yellow.

It is used to find the organisms that cause cat-scratch disease (Bartonella henselae) and syphilis (Treponema pallidum) and sensitive for Mycobacterium tuberculosis.

== Additional images ==
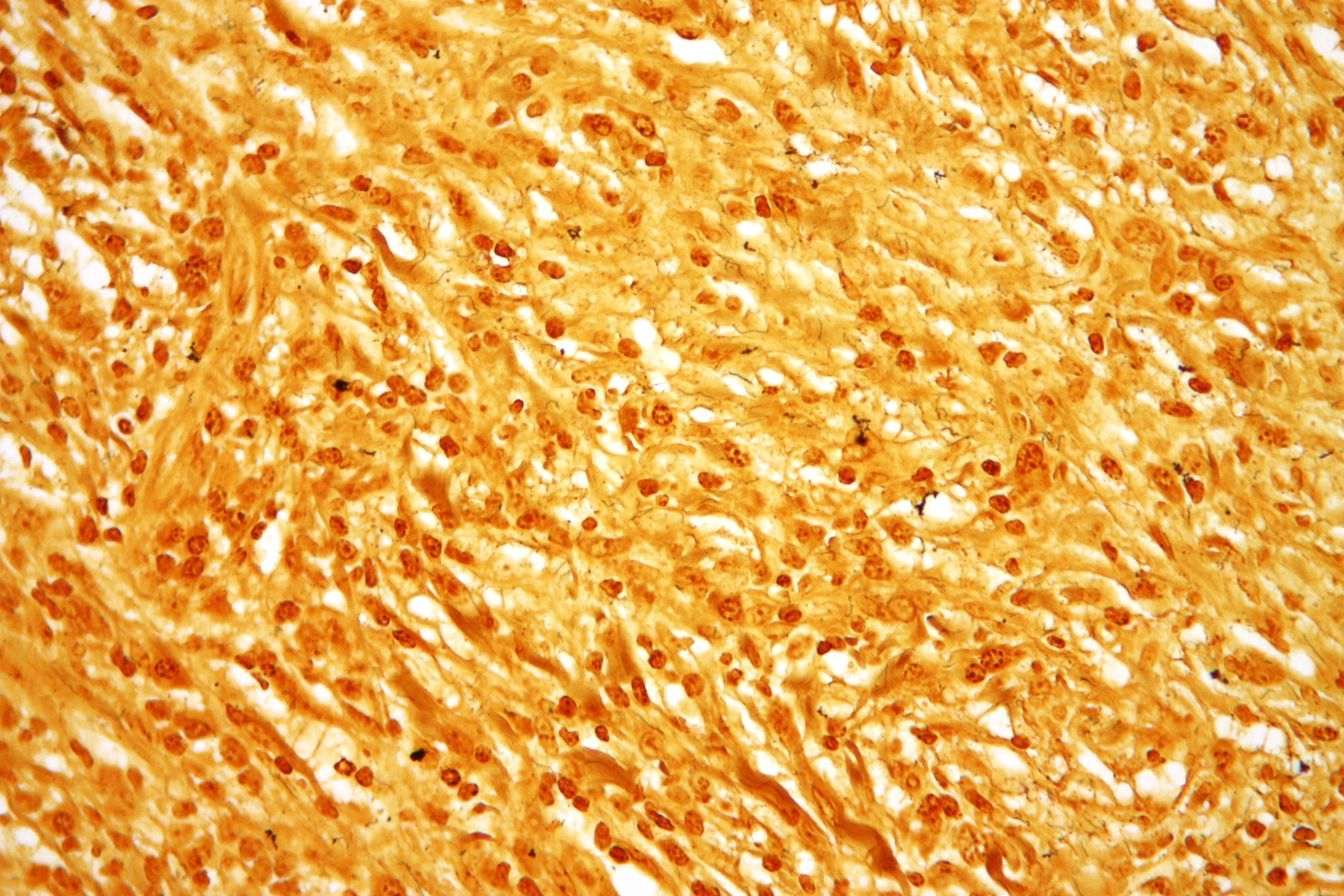

== See also ==
- Staining
- Warthin–Starry stain
