= Parinaud's oculoglandular syndrome =

- Specialty: Ophthalmology
- Symptoms: Red, irritated, and painful eye; fever; general lack of well-being; swelling of nearby lymph glands; increased tearing
- Usual onset: Varies based on underlying cause
- Duration: Varies based on underlying cause and treatment
- Causes: Most commonly caused by cat-scratch disease; occasionally caused by other infections
- Risk factors: Exposure to cats, especially kittens; cat scratches or bites
- Diagnostic method: Based on symptoms, clinical findings, and patient history; can include serology, culture, and PCR tests
- Prevention: Avoiding cat scratches or bites; proper hygiene when handling cats
- Treatment: Primarily involves treating the underlying cause
- Medication: Depends on the underlying cause
- Prognosis: Varies depending on the underlying cause and the patient's overall health
- Frequency: Rare

Parinaud's oculoglandular syndrome (POS) is a medical condition characterized by a specific set of symptoms affecting the eye and nearby lymph nodes. Named after the French ophthalmologist Henri Parinaud, it should not be confused with the neurological syndrome caused by a lesion in the midbrain which is also known as Parinaud's syndrome. Both were named after the same person, Henri Parinaud.

== Signs and symptoms ==
The syndrome manifests as granulomatous conjunctivitis in one eye, accompanied by swollen lymph nodes in front of the ear on the same side. Granulomatous conjunctivitis refers to inflammation of the conjunctiva, the membrane that covers the white part of the eye, characterized by the presence of granulomas, small areas of inflammation due to tissue injury. Patients with POS may experience a red, irritated, and painful eye, fever, a general lack of well-being, swelling of nearby lymph glands, and sometimes increased tearing.

== Causes ==
The most common cause of POS is cat-scratch disease, an infectious disease that typically results from a scratch or bite from a cat. However, this syndrome is an unusual feature of cat-scratch disease. In rare cases, other infections may also cause the syndrome.

- Bartonella henselae
- Francisella tularensis
- Herpes simplex virus type 1
- Paracoccidioides brasiliensis

== Diagnosis ==
Diagnostic tests vary by symptoms, clinical findings, and patient history. They can include serology, culture, and PCR.
