= Bacillary peliosis =

Bacterial disease of the liver

Bacillary peliosis is a form of peliosis hepatis that has been associated with bacteria in the genus Bartonella. It is characterized by numerous, small blood filled cysts that form in the liver, spleen, lymph nodes, skin, bone, and brain. These blood filled cysts are infected with Bartonella. Based on very small sample epidemiologic studies, those with HIV infection are most likely to develop bacillary peliosis. In the small population based study, of 49 people with bacillary peliosis with Bartonella, 92% had HIV. Other cases of bacillary peliosis were seen in those with chronic infections, advanced cancer, tuberculosis, and those using anabolic steroids. Also based on limited population based studies, the species of Bartonella that is associated with bacillary peliosis hepatis (lesions affecting the liver) is Bartonella henselae. In that small population based study, those with liver lesions exclusively had B. henselae. Barontella henselae may also affect the spleen and lymph nodes. Bartonella quintana is associated with lesions of the skin, soft tissues (both deeper soft tissues and under the skin) and destructive bone lesions. Both quintana and henselae species may cause skin lesions.

Symptoms of bacillary peliosis hepatis (lesions affecting the liver) include chronic fever, enlarged liver and spleen, swollen lymph nodes, poor appetite, weight loss, and recurrent diarrhea. When the skin is involved (cutaneous bacillary angiomatosis), the presentation is numerous dark, blood filled growths on the skin ranging in size from pinpoint to 10 cm. The lesions may bleed. Bacillary peliosis hepatis also presents with elevated liver enzymes and elevated alkaline phosphatase levels. In those with HIV and AIDS, those with low CD4 T-cell numbers are much more likely to develop bacillary peliosis. Bacillary peliosis hepatis is rarely associated with internal bleeding from the liver or spleen, which may be fatal.

Bartonella henselae is thought to be transmitted to humans from cat bites or scratches, with cat fleas also potentially acting as a vector. A small population based study used DNA fingerprinting to definitively link Bartonella henselae strains causing bacillary peliosis hepatis in humans to that of their pet cats, using tissue or blood samples from both sources. Bartonella quintana is associated with low income, homelessness, and lice exposure. It is spread from human contact via lice exposure. An animal reservoir is not known, and cat ownership is not a risk factor for B. quintana infection. No other Bartonella species are known to cause bacillary peliosis (other than quintana and henselae).

Grossly, bacillary peliosis hepatis lesions present as cystic, blood filled clusters. Microscopically, the lesions involve multiple dilated blood filled cavities (sometimes with a thin lining of epithelium), or rare clumps of capillaries interspersed amongst fibrous tissue or granulation tissue. Sometimes these blood filled cavities coalese with nearby liver sinusoid blood vessels.

Bacillary peliosis involving lymph nodes presents as similar blood filled sinuses distorting and displacing the normal lymph node archetecture.

In bacillary peliosis due to both B. henselae and B. quintana, exposure to macrolide antibiotics in the preceding 6 months is thought to be protective, with those who have HIV being less likely to form the lesions in their livers, spleens, skin, soft tissues or other structures. Another study showed that exposure to macrolide antibiotics was associated with less lesions, a decrease in the liver size and an improvement of symptoms.

Bacillary peliosis hepatis was first described by researchers in 1990, with the researchers postulating that a bacteria was responsible for the blood filled lesions. The researchers noted rod shaped organisms on Warthin–Starry staining and electron microscopy which they suspected was bacteria. However, the researchers were unable to culture the bacteria at the time. Later in the decade, with more advanced culture techniques and polymerase chain reaction testing, the causative organism was confirmed as bacteria, specifically Bartonella henselae and Bartonella quintana.
