= BH11960 =

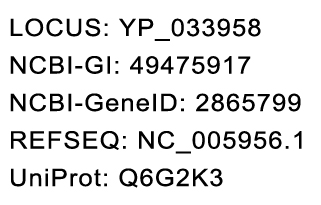

Bartonella henselae hypothetical protein 11960 (BH11960) is encoded by the BH11960 gene. This hypothetical protein is conserved in all Bartonella species whose genomes have been sequenced to date, and are highlighted in the picture below.

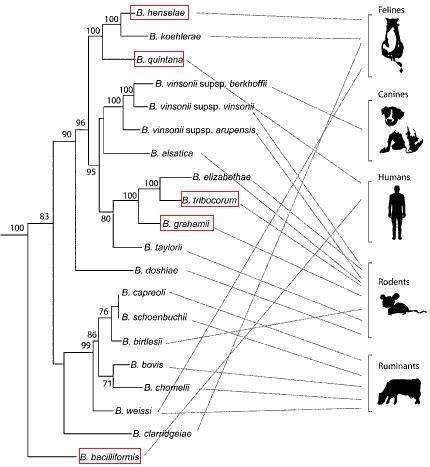

Bartonella henselae is a gram-negative bacterial pathogen of humans and animals. Like other members of the alphaproteobacteria subdivision, B. henselae is capable of establishing an intracellular lifestyle within eukaryotic cells (3). Infection of immunocompetent humans with B. henselae results in “cat scratch disease,” a regional lymphadenopathy that is typically associated with wounds of feline origin (12, 22). In most cases, the lymph node lesions are self-limiting and antibiotic therapy is not indicated (32). However, in 5 to 14% of infected individuals, atypical manifestations can occur, including prolonged fever, malaise, fatigue, myalgia, arthralgia, weight loss, splenomegaly, and Parinaud's oculoglandular syndrome (32). In contrast, infection of immunosuppressed humans can result in a variety of severe and life-threatening disease syndromes, such as bacillary angiomatosis, peliosis hepatis, endocarditis, and bacteremia (22). Even in cases of severe disease, antibiotic therapy is often effective, but relapses can occur (32).

== Properties ==
Nucleotides	2085
Amino acids	934
Position on genome	1328993-1331797
Molecular weight	104093.4
Motifs	Aerotolerance regulator N-terminal (E-value 5.3e-17)
Isoelectric point	9.23
AA composition	14.2% leucine
Estimated half-life	>10 hours in E. coli, in vivo, 30 hours in mammalian reticulocytes
Instability index	41.68 unstable

== Function ==
The function of the BH11960 protein is not known, but its function is thought to be involved in signal transduction that regulates aerotolerance in conjunction with the other genes within its cluster. Evidence for such function is:

- Presence of a PRKEL signal peptide domain at the N-terminus of the protein on all orthologs
- Presence of MoxR-AAA family protein in the four-gene cluster, which is predicted to serve as a chaperone
- Hypothesis: The signal peptide PRKEL allows for the cleavage of the N-terminal aerotolerance regulator, which is released into the cytoplasm and folded by the interacting chaperone. This cleaved and modified protein serves as a sensor for oxygen concentration changes and may go on to interact with other parts of the cell to induce a response mechanism.

== Protein sequence ==
The importance of this protein lies in the beginning of the sequence, and is represented in the conceptual translation below. This region contains the aerotolerance motif, the transmembrane hydrophobic segment highlighted in yellow, and a high-conservation region represented in all studied orthologs. Furthermore, a signal peptide protein is present in this region that allows transport of a protein.

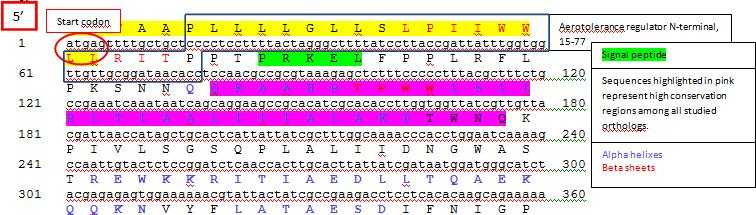

Based on sequence analysis performed by PSortB program, this protein is located in the cytoplasmic membrane of this Gram-negative bacterium and contains a double transmembrane domain.

== Gene neighborhood ==
The four-gene cluster of BH11940, BH11950, BH11960, and BH11970 all produce proteins of unknown function transcribed on the sense strand and encoded by the same promoter. The promoter is ubiquitously conserved in the other Bartonella species and contains a TATA box. BH11960 is the largest of the four proteins.

Bartonella henselae: BH11960. KEGG Database.

== Homologs ==
Genus/species	Gene name	Accession number	Sequence length	Sequence similarity
Bartonella henselae	Hypothetical protein	BX897699.1	2805nt/934aa	100
Bartonella quintana	Hypothetical protein	BX897700.1	2805nt/934aa	91
Bartonella grahamii	Transcription regulator	CP001562.1	2799nt/932aa	87
Bartonella tribocorum	Alanyl-tRNA synthetase	AM260525.1	2799nt/932aa	87
Methylobacterium nodulans	Hypothetical protein	YP_002500318.1	2820nt/939aa	53
Nitrobacter hamburgensis	Double transmembrane region like	YP_578448.1	2817nt/938aa	53
Hyphomicrobium denitrificans	Conserved hypothetical protein	ZP_05374729.1	2973nt/990aa	53
Rhodopseudomonas palustris	Double transmembrane region like	YP_568432.1	2826nt/941aa	54
Hoeflea phototrophica	Double transmembrane region like	YP_002289983.1	1832nt/943aa	55
Oceanicola batsensis	Hypothetical protein OB2597_11306	ZP_00998791.1	2771nt/923aa	48
