= Peliosis hepatis =

Presence of blood-filled cavities in the liver

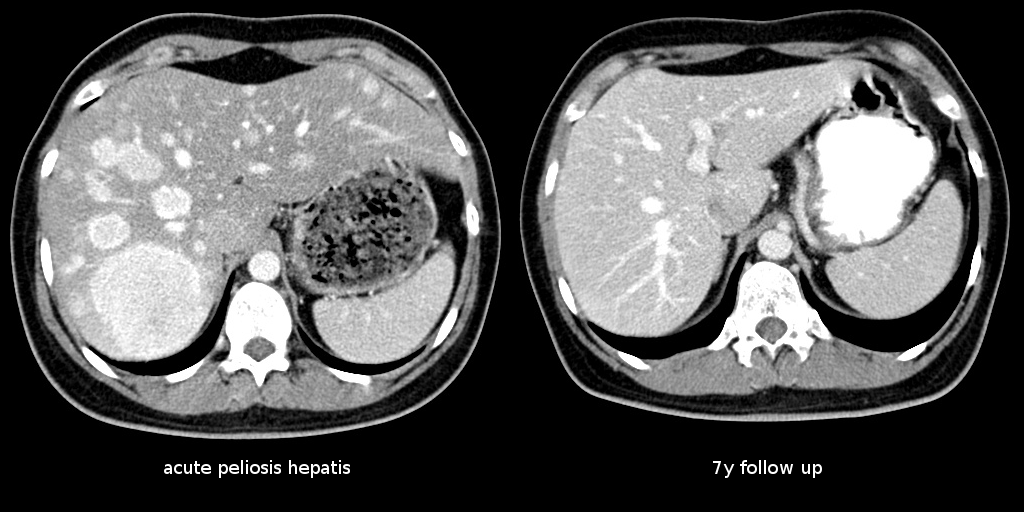
- The CT scan of a patient with peliosis hepatis (left): The follow-up CT (right) after 7 years shows full remission.
- Specialty: Gastroenterology, hepatology
- Symptoms: asymptomatic, abdominal pain, jaundice

Peliosis hepatis is an uncommon vascular condition characterised by multiple, randomly distributed, blood-filled cavities throughout the liver. The size of the cavities usually ranges between a few millimetres and 3 cm in diameter. In the past, it was a mere histological curiosity occasionally found at autopsies, but has been increasingly recognised with wide-ranging conditions from AIDS to the use of anabolic steroids. It also occasionally affects spleen, lymph nodes, lungs, kidneys, adrenal glands, bone marrow, and other parts of gastrointestinal tract.

Peliosis hepatis is often erroneously written "peliosis hepatitis", despite it not being one of the hepatitides. The correct term arises from the Greek pelios, i.e. discoloured by extravasated blood, livid, and the Latinized genitive case (hepatis) of the Greek hepar, liver.

== Signs and symptoms ==
Often, peliosis hepatis causes no symptoms (asymptomatic). In other cases, it may be identified after blood tests show abnormalities in liver enzymes.

Less commonly, peliosis hepatis may cause abdominal pain, especially right upper quadrant pain, or jaundice.

== Presentation ==
=== Disease associations ===
- Infections: HIV, bacillary peliosis (caused by genus Bartonella, bacteria responsible for cat-scratch disease which are identified histologically adjacent to the peliotic lesions), Staphylococcus aureus
- Chronic conditions: End stage kidney failure, kwashiorkor, tuberculosis, and other chronic infections
- Malignancy: Monoclonal gammopathies (multiple myeloma and Waldenström's macroglobulinemia), Hodgkin disease, malignant histiocytosis, seminoma, hepatocellular adenoma, and hepatocarcinoma
- Kidney transplants: It can be found in up to 20% patients, can be related to azathioprine or cyclosporine use, and may be associated with increased risk of transplant rejection.
- Drugs and toxins: Corticosteroids, androgens, azathioprine, tamoxifen

== Pathophysiology ==
The pathogenesis of peliosis hepatis is unknown. Several hypotheses are given, such as it arises from sinusoidal epithelial damage, increased sinusoidal pressure due to obstruction in blood outflow from the liver, or hepatocellular necrosis.

Peliosis hepatis is associated with infections, cancers, organ transplantation, blood disorders, autoimmune conditions, and certain medications.

Two morphologic patterns of hepatic peliosis were described by Yanoff and Rawson. In the phlebectatic type, the blood-filled spaces are lined with endothelium and are associated with aneurysmal dilatation of the central vein; in the parenchymal type, the spaces have no endothelial lining and they usually are associated with haemorrhagic parenchymal necrosis. Some consider both patterns to be one process, initiated by focal necrosis of liver parenchyma, observed in parenchymal type, progressing into formation of fibrous wall and endothelial lining around haemorrhage of phlebectatic type. Fibrosis, cirrhosis, regenerative nodules, and tumours may also be seen.

== Diagnosis ==
The condition is typically asymptomatic and is discovered following evaluation of abnormal liver function test. However, when severe, it can manifest as jaundice, hepatomegaly, liver failure, and haemoperitoneum. In CT and MRI, peliosis hepatis show early contrast enhancement with delayed centrifugal enhancement. Ultrasound may show a non-specific hyperechoic mass.

=== Other cystic conditions of liver ===
- Polycystic liver disease
- Solitary congenital cysts
- Congenital hepatic fibrosis
- Hydatid cyst
- Von Meyenburg complexes
- Caroli disease (type V choledochal cyst)
- Type IV choledochal cysts

== Treatment ==
Treatment is usually directed towards management of the underlying cause. Withdrawal of azathioprine leads to remission in kidney transplant; bacillary peliosis responds to antibiotics. In rare circumstances partial resection of liver or transplant may be required.

== Epidemiology ==
Peliosis hepatis usually affects adults, though may occur in children. Peliosis hepatis occurs equally in men and women.

== History ==
Peliosis hepatis was first described in 1861.
