= CagZ =

Protein produced by Helicobacter pylori bacteria

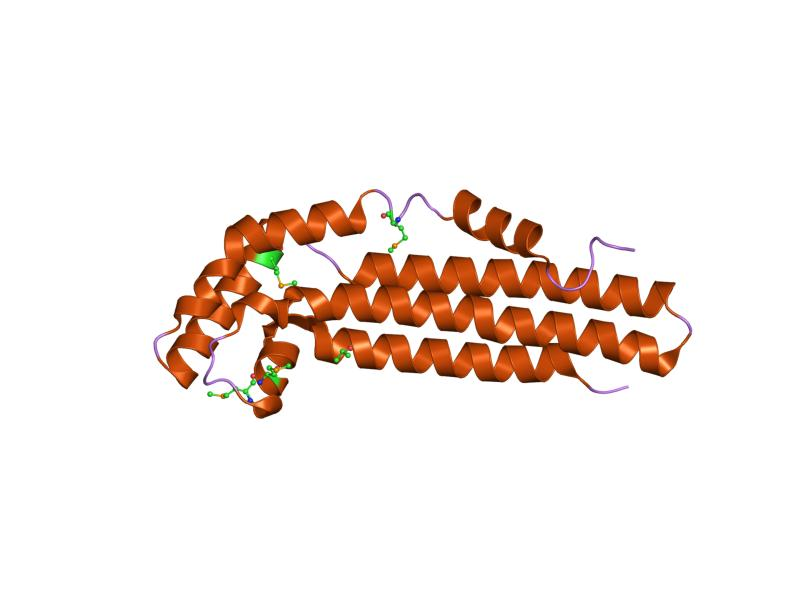
- crystal structure of cag-z from helicobacter pylori

Identifiers
- Symbol: CagZ
- Pfam: PF09053
- InterPro: IPR015139
Available protein structures:
- PDB: IPR015139 PF09053 (ECOD; PDBsum)
- AlphaFold: IPR015139; PF09053

In molecular biology, CagZ is a protein produced by Helicobacter pylori (Campylobacter pylori). It is a 23 kDa protein consisting of a single compact L-shaped domain, composed of seven alpha-helices that run antiparallel to each other. 70% of the amino acids are in alpha-helix conformation and no beta-sheet is present. CagZ is essential for the translocation of the pathogenic protein CagA into host cells.
