= Aldred Scott Warthin =

American pathologist

- Born: October 21, 1866; Greensburg, Indiana, US
- Died: May 23, 1931 (aged 64); Ann Arbor, Michigan, US
- Education: Indiana University; University of Michigan Medical School
- Occupation: Pathologist
- Known for: Research on cancer heritability and syphilis
- Scientific career
- Fields: Cancer genetics, pathology
- Workplaces: Michigan University

Aldred Scott Warthin (October 21, 1866 − May 23, 1931) was an American pathologist whose research laid the foundation for understanding the heritability of certain cancers. He has been described as "the father of cancer genetics."

== Early life and education ==
He was born October 21, 1866, in Greensburg, Indiana. His parents were Edward Mason Warthin and Eliza Margaret (Weist) Warthin. As a young man he studied piano and earned a teacher's diploma from the Cincinnati Conservatory of Music in 1877. In 1888 he received an A.B. in science from Indiana University.

He then entered the University of Michigan Medical School, earning an M.A. in 1890, an M.D. in 1891 and a Ph.D. in 1893. He did postgraduate study in Vienna and Freiburg, then joined the faculty at the University of Michigan, where he remained for the rest of his career.

== Career ==
In 1892 he was appointed a demonstrator in internal medicine at the University of Michigan. In 1895 he took charge of the pathology laboratory, and in 1903 he was named laboratory director and professor of pathology, positions he held until his death in 1931. He also served as chair of the pathology department for most of that time. He taught more than 3,000 medical students, who described him as "the greatest living teacher of pathology".

He was a master of the American College of Physicians and served as its first vice president. He also served as editor of the Annals of Clinical Medicine (now the Annals of Internal Medicine). He was elected president of the American Association for Cancer Research for the 1927–1928 term.

In 1930 he published a book The Creed of a Biologist: A Biologic Philosophy of Life, in which he outlined his views on heredity, evolution, and the development of life. The book reflected his support for the inheritance of acquired characteristics and for eugenics, which he regarded as a means of improving future generations. These positions reflected ideas that were common in the early 20th century.

== Research ==
In 1895, a young seamstress of his acquaintance told him about her family's long history of cancer deaths. Intrigued, he researched her family's history, searching death records and administering questionnaires, and found multiple cases of cancer. He followed the family, which he called "family G", for decades, and in 1913 he published their history in the Archives of Internal Medicine. His article was one of the first to make the case that cancer was heritable in humans, and the medical pedigree of family G (which was later determined to suffer from hereditary nonpolyposis colorectal cancer or Lynch Syndrome) is one of the longest and most detailed cancer genealogies in the world. By 1913 he had worked up the pedigrees of 29 cancer-susceptible families. He found one family in which 27 of the 144 descendants of a cancer patient also had cancer. He located several sets of identical twins that developed identical cancers in mirror-image sites. He became convinced that both susceptibility and immunity to cancer could be inherited. He began his genetic studies before Gregor Mendel's principles of genetics became widely known. It took many decades before the heritability of cancer was finally accepted by the medical community, partly through the research of Henry T. Lynch.

Although he is best known today for his groundbreaking research on the heritability of cancer, during his lifetime he was better known for other things. He studied the pathology of syphilis for 20 years and became the world's leading authority on the subject. He and his research associate developed the Warthin-Starry stain still used to demonstrate the presence of syphilis spirochetes. Some thought his most important work was his study of diseases of the reticuloendothelial system. He studied the effects of the chemical weapon mustard gas, about which he co-wrote a book in 1919.

== Personal life ==
In 1900 he married another physician, Katherine Angell (born 1869), and they had four children. She died in 1940. His hobbies included golf, raising flowers (especially phlox), and collecting artistic portrayals of death, about which he wrote a scholarly monograph, The Physician of the Dance of Death. He died suddenly of asthma on May 23, 1931. He is buried in South Park Cemetery, Greensburg, Indiana.

== Legacy ==
- Adenolymphoma of the parotid gland, or papillary cystadenoma lymphomatosum, is better known as "Warthin's tumor"; he described two cases in 1929.
- One of the pulmonary signs of pericarditis is named "Warthin's sound".
- The Warthin-Starry stain, a silver-based stain for spirochetes, is named for him.
- He discovered a species of snail that was named in his honor.
- In 1927 his students and colleagues honored him with a Festschrift named Contributions to Medical Science.
- Warthin-Finkeldey cell
- His collected papers are preserved in the Bentley Historical Library at the University of Michigan.
