= Recurrent painful ophthalmoplegic neuropathy =

- Other names: Ophthalmoplegic migraine
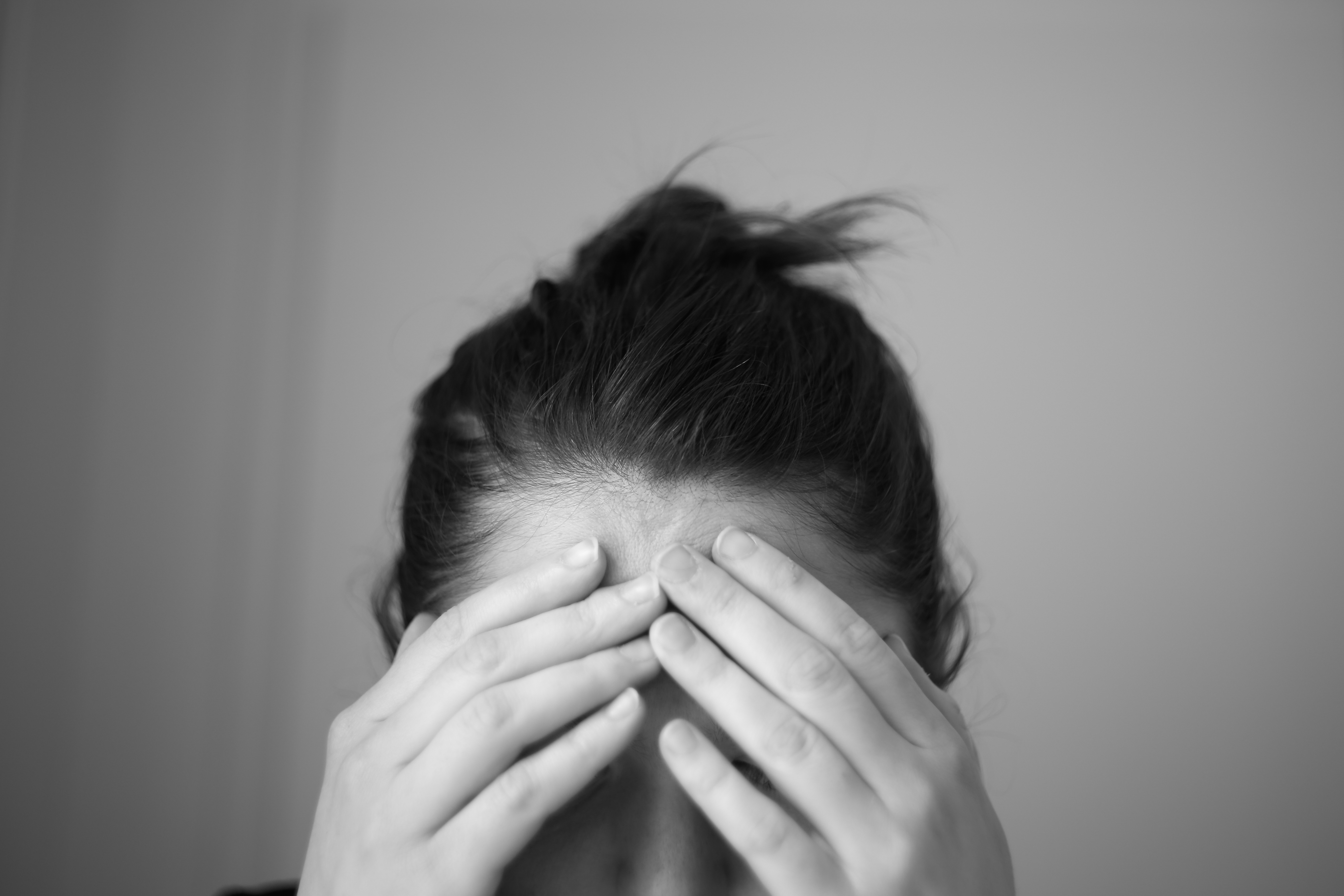
- Recurrent painful ophthalmoplegic neuropathy (RPON) is characterized by episodes of headaches and ophthalmoplegia.
- Specialty: Neurology, ophthalmology
- Symptoms: Headaches, strabismus, ptosis, double vision
- Usual onset: Childhood
- Duration: Recurrent, long-term
- Causes: Migrainous; neuropathy
- Diagnostic method: Physical examination (eye, neurological), neuroimaging (MRI, MRA, CTA, DSA), laboratory tests (blood test, lumbar puncture)
- Medication: Corticosteroids
- Frequency: 0.7 per million (1990)

Recurrent painful ophthalmoplegic neuropathy (RPON), previously known as ophthalmoplegic migraine (OM), is a rare neurological disorder that is characterized by repeated headache attacks and reversible ipsilateral paresis of one or more ocular cranial nerves (CN). Oculomotor nerve (CNIII) is by far the most common cranial nerve involves in RPON, while abducens nerve (CNVI) and trochlear nerve (CNIV) involvements are also reported. Globally, RPON was estimated to have an annual incidence rate of 0.7 per million as of 1990, no further epidemiological studies have been conducted. It occurs more often in children and females.

Although the etiology of RPON is unknown owing to the rarity of this disease, various potential theories including migrainous and neuropathic mechanisms have been developed. Diagnosis is based on physical examination, magnetic resonance imaging (MRI), and ruling out other possible causes. Despite the fact that there are currently no evidence-based treatment guidelines for RPON, the most commonly used medications are corticosteroids that have been proven effective in alleviating the symptoms. As for people who are unresponsive to steroids, other treatments, such as anti-migraine drugs, botulinum toxin injection and strabismus surgery, may be utilized. For prevention, several medications including calcium channel blockers may be used. However, none have been proved consistently effective. RPON has a good overall prognosis as a result of the self-limiting nature of the condition, but permanent neurological damage may accumulate over repeated episodes.

== Signs and symptoms ==
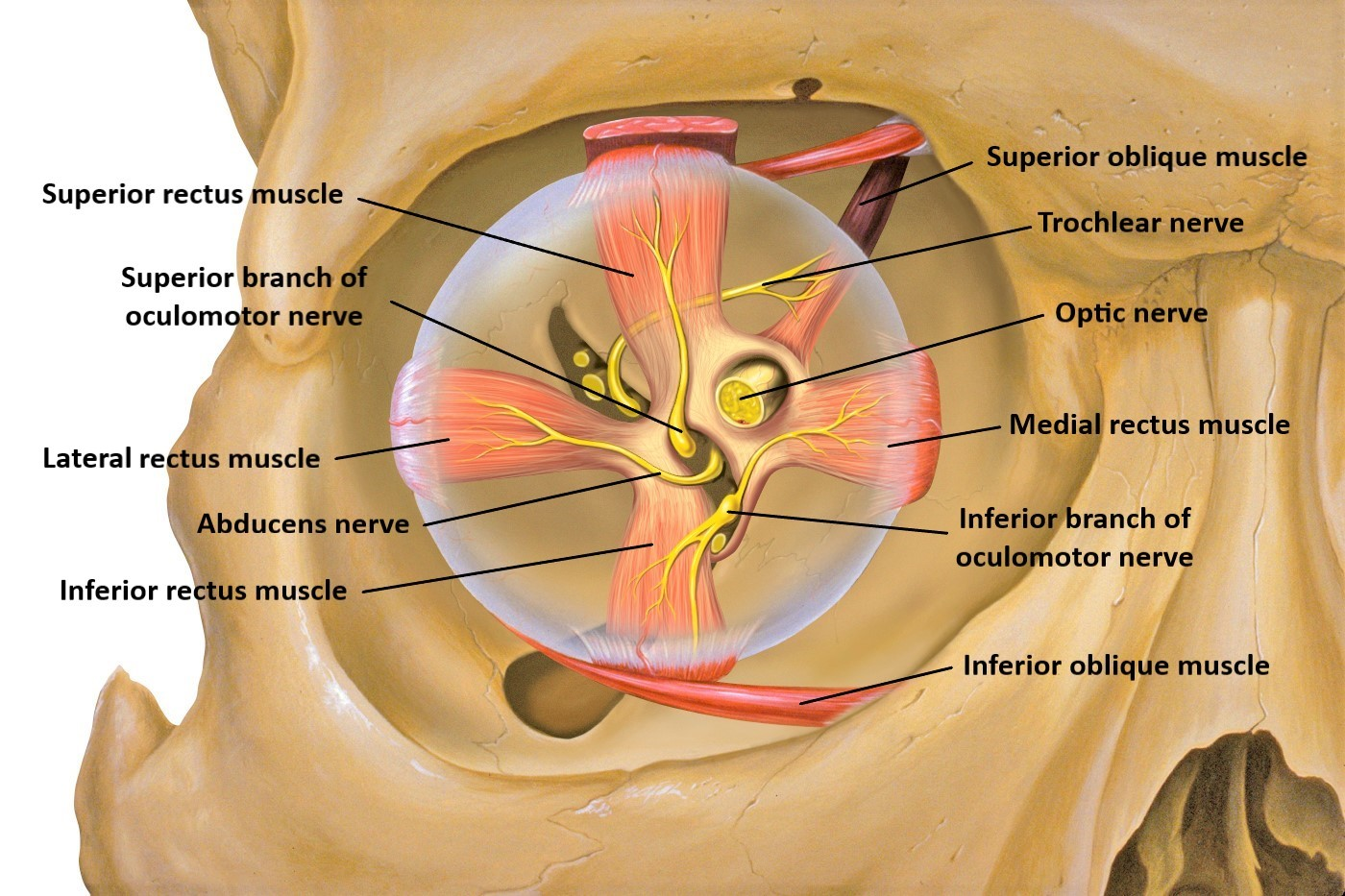
Diagram illustrating the locations of extraocular muscles and ocular cranial nerves. Paresis of the oculomotor nerve (CNIII) reduces the strength of medial rectus, superior rectus, inferior rectus, and inferior oblique muscles, while trochlear nerve (CNIV) and abducens nerve (CNVI) paralysis affect superior oblique muscle and lateral rectus muscle respectively.

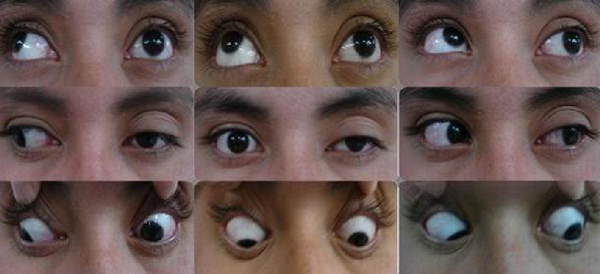
Physical examination showing ophthalmoplegia affecting the left eye. The central image represents forward gaze while other images represents different direction of gaze. Drooping of eyelids (ptosis) and nonaligned eyes (strabismus) are observed, showing paresis of CNIII, CNIV and CNVI.

The typical symptoms of RPON are recurrent headaches and ipsilateral paralysis of the extraocular muscles (ophthalmoplegia) that are responsible for controlling eye movements. People with RPON experience different severity of pain, duration of symptoms, and frequency of attacks, which are also dependent on the treatment they received. The attacks of RPON usually occur on the same side of the head in subsequent episodes.

=== Headache ===
The most common type of headache is migraine-like, usually accompanied by symptoms such as nausea, vomiting, photophobia, or phonophobia. Less commonly, RPON can occur without migrainous headache nor accompanied by the classical migrainous symptoms. The frequency of headaches can range from several times per month to once in several years, while the duration varies from several days to a week, which lasts longer than that of a typical migraine.

=== Ophthalmoplegia ===
Ophthalmoplegia usually occurs either concurrently or within 1 week after the onset of headache, and less commonly up to 2 weeks. The ocular manifestation of RPON depend on which ocular cranial nerve is being affected. CNIII is involved in the vast majority of cases, but the involvement of CNVI and CNIV is also reported in studies. Typical ocular signs involving CNIII include outwards and downwards drifting of eyes (strabismus), difficulty in controlling inward and upward eye movements, drooping of eyelid (ptosis) and double vision. Pupil dilation (mydriasis) and reduction in pupillary light reflexes can also be observed as pupillomotor fibers are also affected by CNIII paralysis. Rare cases involve abducens nerve paralysis affects lateral eye movement while trochlear nerve paralysis affects vertical eye movement. Similar to headache, ophthalmoplegia usually resolve gradually and completely over time, but recovery may be incomplete after several episodes.

== Pathophysiology ==
The etiology of RPON is still unknown and remains controversial - some scientists believe that RPON is a subtype of migraine, while others believe that it is a neuropathic disorder. As such, different potential etiologic mechanisms have been proposed based on case reports, including migrainous and neuropathic mechanisms. Yet, the renaming of RPON from OM indicates that the neuropathic cause may play a more important role than the migrainous cause in the pathophysiology of RPON.

=== Migrainous mechanism ===
RPON was previously thought to be having a migrainous origin since it shares some common characteristics with migraine, and their only differences are the intensity and duration of headaches. Therefore, it was postulated that migraine caused ophthalmoplegia in RPON. However, the major argument against a migrainous origin is the long latency period between the onset of headache and ophthalmoplegia (up to 14 days), which is not consistent with a typical migraine. Nevertheless, several migrainous mechanisms have been proposed.

==== Nerve compression ====
Compression mechanism is the first theory postulated regarding the pathophysiology of RPON. It is proposed that headache is caused by direct pressure on CNIII (compression neuropathy) within the cavernous sinus due to edema of the walls of the internal carotid artery (ICA) or posterior cerebral artery (PCA) during migraine episodes.

==== Ischemia ====
Cavernous section of the ICA and a perforating vessel from the proximal PCA are responsible for supplying CNIII, CNIV, and CNVI. During migraine attacks, vasoconstriction of the ICA and PCA may lead to a reversible and ischemic breakdown of the blood-brain barrier. The blood-brain barrier breakdown results in vasogenic edema, which promotes the development of RPON.

==== Neuropeptides-induced ====
Alternatively, it is proposed that migraine-related release of neuropeptides from trigeminal nerve fibers terminating on the circle of Willis might be the cause. Some of the neuropeptides released are potentially toxic, and may induce blood-brain barrier breakdown that accounts for ophthalmoplegia.

=== Neuropathic mechanism ===
Additional models have been proposed to explain the cause of RPON. The thickened and enhanced symptomatic nerve, as shown in recent MRI findings, might be indicative of the existence of structural nerve damage in RPON. Therefore, neuropathy is suggested as the primary cause of RPON, either induced by recurrent viral infections or immune-mediated inflammation. However, cerebrospinal fluid (CSF) analyses are normal in the vast majority of RPON cases, which is inconsistent with the findings of autoimmune or inflammatory-mediated pathomechanism. Nevertheless, several neuropathic mechanisms have been proposed.

==== Benign viral infection ====
The enhancement and thickening of the oculomotor nerve can occur in a variety of infectious inflammatory conditions. However, spontaneous resolution is unlikely to occur in viral infection, except for benign viral infection that usually causes mild or no symptoms in humans. Therefore, benign viral infection could be an explanation for the development of RPON.

==== Immune-mediated inflammation ====
Recent MRI findings have led to the current understanding of RPON as an inflammation-induced neuropathy. Recurrent demyelinating neuropathy is proposed as a pathophysiological pathway because similar MRI findings have been observed in both RPON and chronic inflammatory demyelinating neuropathy. Inflammatory demyelination of the ocular cranial nerves would likely lead to the release of neuropeptides, such as calcitonin gene-related peptide, to the trigeminovascular system. This would irritate the trigeminal sensory fibers, and consequently, a headache as manifested in RPON is triggered.

== Diagnosis ==
=== Diagnostic criteria ===
To be diagnosed with RPON, a person must have a minimum of 2 unilateral headache attacks with ipsilateral ocular cranial nerve paralysis that cannot be explained by other causes of headache in ICHD-3 after investigation.

=== Diagnostic tests ===
RPON is a diagnosis of exclusion, meaning that other conditions with similar clinical presentation, such as vascular, inflammatory, neoplastic, and infectious causes, must be ruled out before the confirmation of RPON diagnosis. Physical examination, neuroimaging, and laboratory tests are routinely conducted in clinical practice to evaluate this disease.

==== Physical examination ====
After obtaining the medical history of people with suspected RPON, thorough eye examination and neurological examination are usually performed to assess the extent of neurological impairment, localize the brain regions being affected, and rule out other possible causes for the symptoms. These involve the assessments of visual acuity, eye movements and alignment, pupillary responses, and mental status.

==== Neuroimaging ====
Contrast-enhanced magnetic resonance imaging (MRI) is a diagnostic tool that can facilitate the differentiation of RPON from other diseases. The transient, reversible enhancement or thickening of the ocular motor nerve(s), which can be observed in the MRI scans of a small proportion of affected individuals during acute attacks, is a distinguishing feature of RPON. Cranial nerve enhancement resulted from RPON would gradually disappear as the symptoms subside after an episode, but spontaneous resolution of nerve enhancement is very unlikely to be seen in neoplastic (e.g. schwannoma), inflammatory and infectious diseases. Contrast-enhanced MRI results can also reveal the location of nerve inflammation for disease diagnosis. Although Tolosa–Hunt syndrome (THS) and RPON share many clinical features, THS can be identified by the presence of granulomatous inflammation in the cavernous sinus, superior orbital fissure, or orbit in MRI scans.

Magnetic resonance angiography (MRA) or CT angiography (CTA) can be used to examine cerebral blood vessels and to rule out vascular abnormalities, such as an aneurysm. In cases where intracranial vascular lesions, for example, subarachnoid hemorrhage cannot be completely ruled out after performing MRA or CTA, physicians may consider using traditional digital subtraction angiography (DSA) for more detailed investigation.

==== Laboratory tests ====
Lumbar punctures and blood tests might be performed on those with RPON to identify other possible causes of cranial neuropathy, including diabetes, inflammatory diseases, infections, tumors, and other systemic diseases that involve either the central nervous system or the peripheral nervous system. The detection of abnormalities in these tests suggests that RPON is highly unlikely to be the culprit in cranial neuropathy, and more diagnostic tests should be done to find out the underlying condition.

== Treatment ==
To date, no clinical trials or treatment guidelines for RPON have been published. Since the evaluation of effective treatments is entirely based on evidence from a limited number of case reports, there is some uncertainty surrounding the proposed efficacy of the drugs for treating RPON.

Potential treatments for RPON can be divided into three main categories: preventative therapy, symptomatic treatment, and management of residual symptoms.

=== Preventative therapy ===
Migraine preventive medications, including beta-blockers (e.g. propranolol), calcium channel blockers (e.g. flunarizine), anticonvulsants (e.g. valproate), and antidepressants (e.g. amitriptyline), may be given to those with RPON with the intent of preventing RPON recurrence. Although the efficacy of these preventives has been proposed in various published case studies, there is a lack of compelling evidence suggesting that these anti-migraine drugs have long-term prophylactic effect on future RPON attacks. The initiation of migraine preventive therapy in RPON is only recommended for people who have typical migraine with frequent attacks as a concurrent condition.

=== Symptomatic treatment ===
Corticosteroids are the most frequently reported drugs for treating acute symptoms of RPON. The rationale behind their use in RPON treatment is to reduce ocular cranial nerve inflammation, which is indicated by the presence of nerve enhancement and is also theorized to be a pathophysiological mechanism of RPON, in affected individuals. Early implementation of corticosteroid therapy is considered beneficial to the majority (96.2%) of people with RPON because it can shorten their recovery time and reduce the severity of existing symptoms. Even though various studies have documented the success of using this medication to induce symptomatic relief in affected individuals, the improvement is not as rapid and significant as observed in other inflammatory diseases, such as THS and temporal arteristis. In addition, some steroid non-responders may have worsened RPON symptoms after taking these drugs, suggesting that corticosteroids are not suitable for treating every patient with the condition.

Other drugs, such as nonsteroidal anti-inflammatory drugs (NSAIDs), ergotamine, triptan and acetaminophen, have been investigated for the acute treatment of RPON. However, their efficacy is currently unknown.

=== Management of residual symptoms ===
Depending on the severity of symptoms, various treatment options are available to people with persistent ophthalmoplegia. For mild conditions, prism glasses can be prescribed to correct specific types of double vision. In more extreme cases, additional intervention such as botulinum toxin injection and strabismus surgery, might be required to rebalance the actions of the extraocular muscles. This would improve the alignment of the eyes when they are in primary position. Similarly, surgical correction can be performed on individuals with severe ptosis.

== Prognosis ==
The prognosis of RPON is generally considered favorable, with most affected individuals having spontaneous symptom resolution after an attack. However, the accumulated nerve damage from repeated RPON attacks might increase the severity and persistence of ophthalmoplegia. Among people with recurrent episodes of RPON, about 30-54% develop permanent neurological sequelae, such as persistent mydriasis, ptosis, strabismus and double vision.
