= Warthin–Starry stain =

Silver nitrate-based staining method

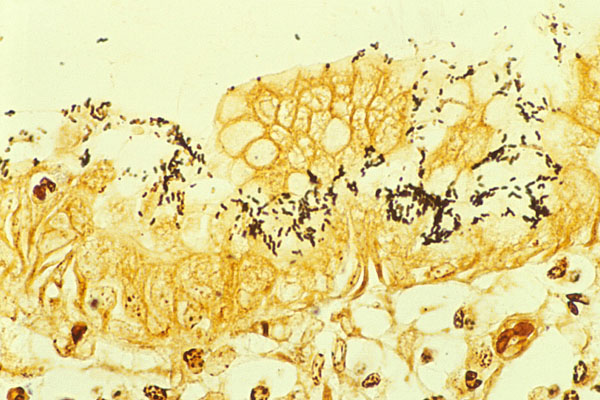
Helicobacter pylori colonized on the surface of regenerative epithelium, stained with the Warthin–Starry method.

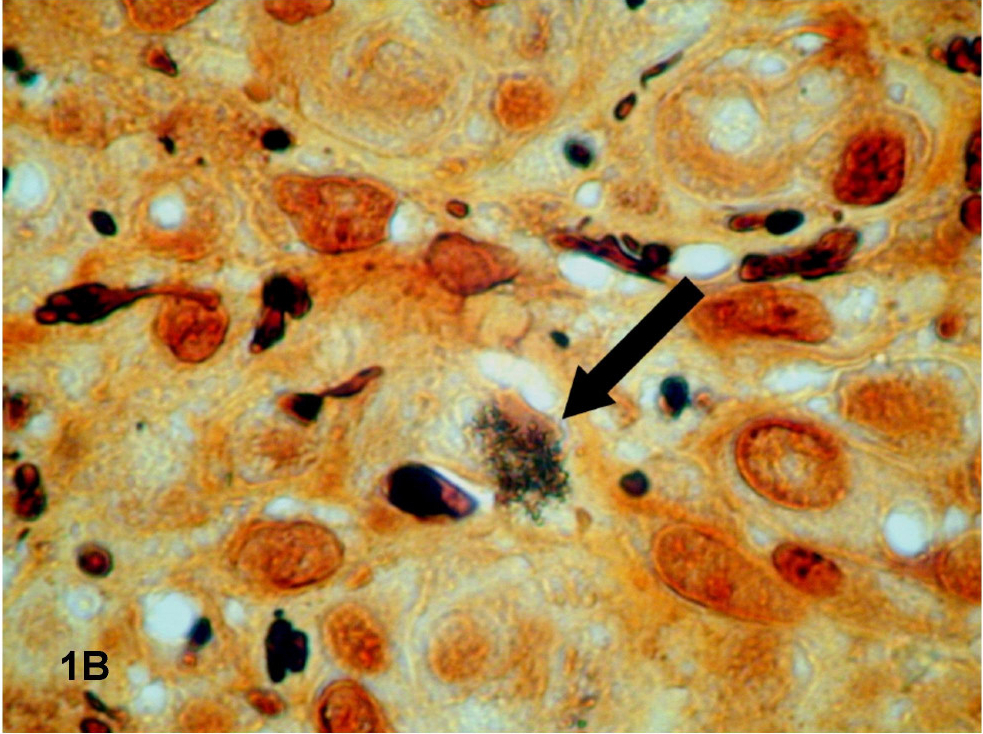
Clusters of bacteria (arrow) shown on Warthin–Starry stain.

The Warthin–Starry stain (WS) is a silver nitrate-based staining method (a silver stain) used in histology. It was first introduced in 1920 by American pathologists Aldred Scott Warthin (1866–1931) and Allen Chronister Starry (1890–1973), for the detection of spirochetes. It has been considered a standard stain for the detection of spirochetes, and is also used to stain Helicobacter pylori, Lawsonia intracellularis, Microsporidia, and particulates. It is also important for confirmation of Bartonella henselae, a causative organism in cat-scratch disease.

Warthin–Starry stains organisms dark brown to black, and the background light golden brown/golden yellow.

== See also ==
- Dieterle stain
