= Flea treatments =

Form of pest control regarding fleas

Flea treatments are procedures used to treat flea infestations in human or animal populations. They may treat both the itching caused by bites and may remove or kill the fleas themselves.

== For humans ==
The itching associated with flea bites can be treated with anti-itch creams, usually antihistamines or hydrocortisone. Calamine lotion has been shown to be effective for itching.

== For pets ==
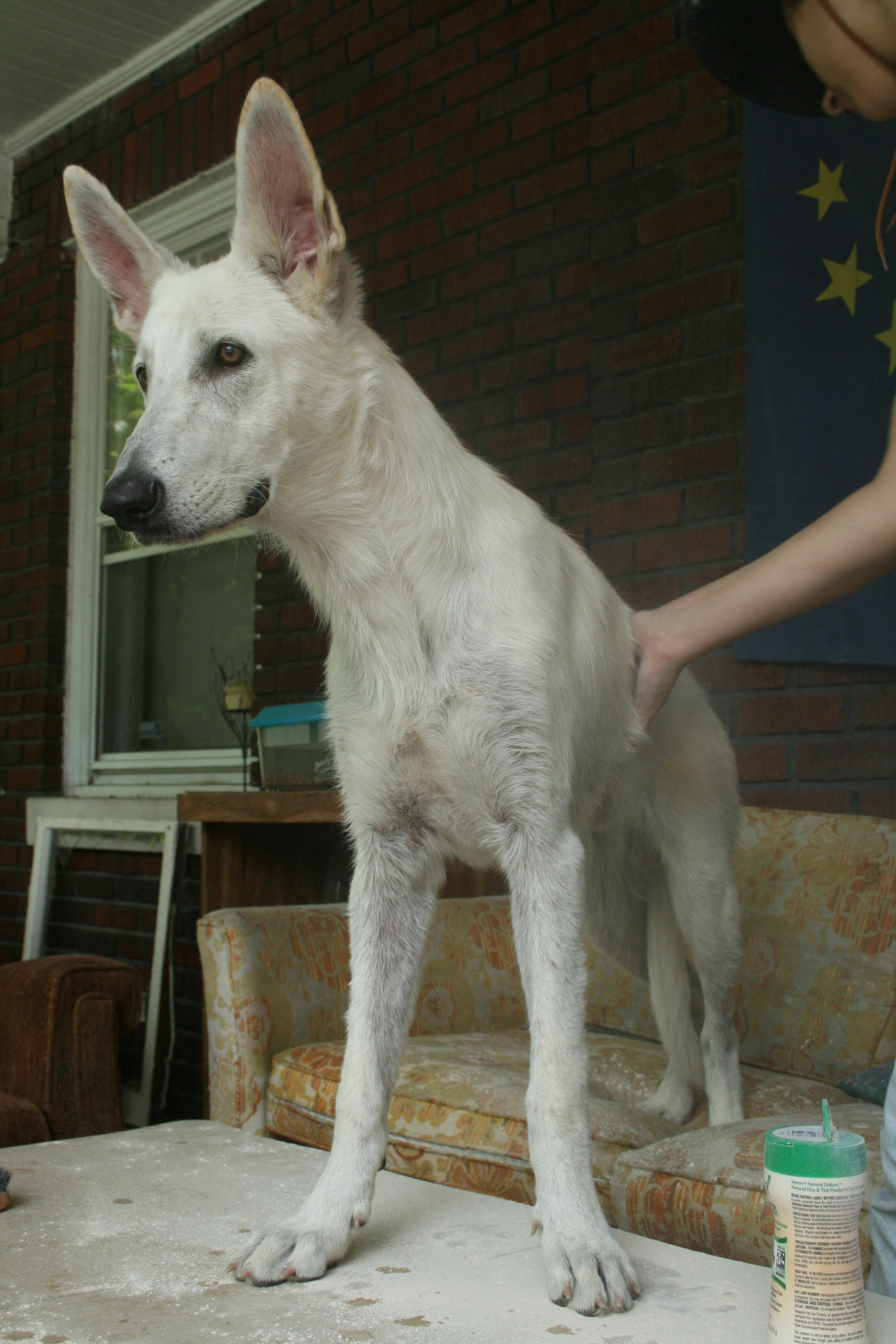
Flea and tick repellant powder being applied to a dog.

Modern flea control is approached using integrated pest management (IPM) protocols at the host (pet) level. IPM is achieved by targeting fleas during at least two separate life stages, with at least two separate molecules. This is typically achieved using an adulticide to kill adult fleas and an insect development inhibitor (IDI), such as lufenuron, or insect growth regulator (IGR), such as methoprene, to prevent development of immature stages.

Flea adults, larvae, or eggs can be controlled with insecticides. Lufenuron is a veterinary preparation (known as Program) that attacks the larval flea's ability to produce chitin, necessary for the adult's hard exoskeleton, but it does not kill fleas. Flea medicines need to be used with care because many of them also affect mammals.

Pyrethrin based flea treatments meant for dogs can be hazardous to cats. Flea and tick ointment is also hazardous to humans. If the product comes into contact with human skin, it is recommended to wash thoroughly with soap and water.

Since more than three-quarters of a flea's life is spent somewhere other than on the host animal, it is not adequate to treat only the host; it is important also to treat the host's environment. Thorough vacuuming, washing linens in hot water, and treating all hosts in the immediate environment (the entire household, for example) is essential for successful eradication. These steps should be performed on a regular basis.

Contemporary commercial products for the topical treatment of flea infestations on pets contain pesticides such as imidacloprid, permethrin, and (S)-methoprene. All flea-control products are recommended to be used at least half-yearly because the lifecycle of flea can last up to a year. Although these products are effective in fighting against flea and tick infestations, they have different active ingredients and, because cats cannot metabolize some of the compounds of the product, care must be taken in their use.

== For the home ==
Flea infestation in the home is treated in various ways.

Insecticides. A spot-on insecticide kills the fleas on the pet. A fogger or spray insecticide containing an insect growth regulator, such as pyriproxyfen or methoprene can kill eggs and pupae, which are quite resistant to insecticides. A comparison of 3 insecticides (selamectin, fipronil, imidacloprid) showed that selamectin reduced larval cat fleas ≥93.5% after 24 h at doses of ≥0.3 μg. In contrast, at 24 h neither fipronil nor imidacloprid reached 90% reduction, even at the highest doses tested (0.5 μg for fipronil and 5.0 μg for imidacloprid). A similar pattern of activity was observed at both 48 and 72 h, but higher percentages of larvae were killed for each of the compounds as the incubation time increased.

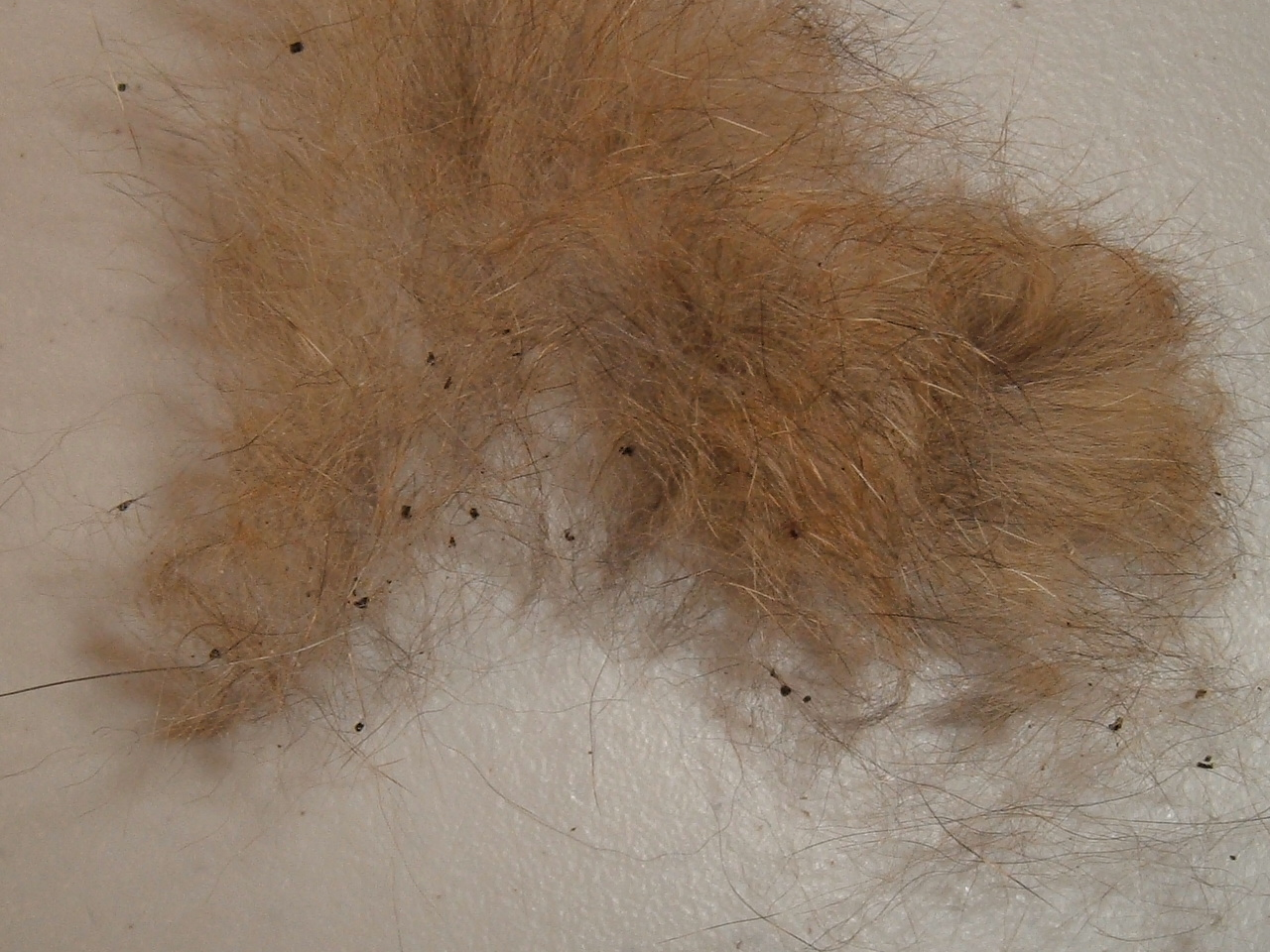
Flea fecal material, coiled larva, and fleas in the pupal stage combed from a cat, are also called flea dirt.

Vacuuming. Frequent and thorough vacuuming is also helpful. The vacuum must be used around everything the animal frequents in order to pick up all the larvae and eggs. Traditional advice recommends disposing of the bag after each vacuuming. One very limited experiment (only one vacuum sweeper used on a single type of carpeted surface) found that vacuuming killed 96% of adult fleas and 100% of younger fleas. This preliminary study's applicability to other circumstances is unclear.

Diatomaceous earth can also be used as a home flea treatment in lieu of acetylcholinesterase inhibitory treatments or insecticides which carry with them a risk of poisoning for both humans and other animals. However, diatomaceous earth dust is harmful to pets and people when inhaled, requiring use of a dust mask to apply.

Bathing dramatically reduces the flea population on a badly infested animal, especially when in combination with a mild detergent or shampoo and brushing or combing.

Borax can be used to treat flea infestations. It kills fleas by dehydrating them, but its safety for pets is untested.

Temperature. Fleas cannot withstand high temperatures, so a turn through the dryer on medium or high kills fleas on clothing.

Water and detergent. Fleas can be drowned by immersion for about 24 hours; they may appear to be dead if immersed for shorter times, but can revive after some hours. Soaps and surfactants can facilitate the death of fleas in bathing. The process of washing the flea (and the pet) removes integumental waxes on the flea's body and it dies from dehydration.
