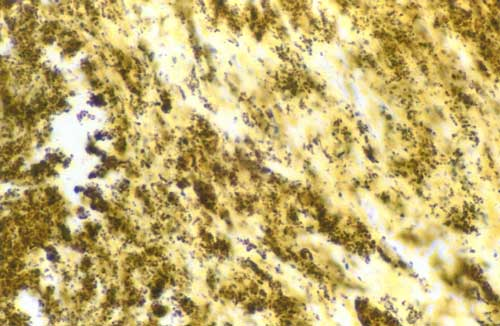

Scientific classification
- Domain: Bacteria
- Kingdom: Pseudomonadati
- Phylum: Pseudomonadota
- Class: Alphaproteobacteria
- Order: Hyphomicrobiales
- Family: Bartonellaceae
- Genus: Bartonella
- Species: B. henselae

Binomial name
- Bartonella henselae (Regnery et al. 1992) Brenner et al. 1993

Synonyms
- Rochalimæa henselae Regnery et al. 1992

= Bartonella henselae =

Species of bacterium

Bartonella henselae, formerly Rochalimæa henselae, is a bacterium that is the causative agent of cat-scratch disease (bartonellosis). It primarily infects red blood cells and endothelial cells and is transmitted to humans through scratches, bites, or flea vectors associated with domestic and feral cats.

Bartonella henselae is a member of the genus Bartonella, one of the most common types of bacteria in the world. It is a facultative intracellular microbe that targets red blood cells. In the United States, about 15,000 cases are diagnosed each year (4.5 cases per 100,000), most between 5-9 years old. Most often, it is transmitted by scratches or bites from kittens. Higher prevalence is reported in warm, humid climates where flea infestations are more common.

== History ==
The specific name henselae honors Diane Marie Hensel (b. 1953), a clinical microbiology technologist at University of Oklahoma Health Sciences Center, who collected numerous strains and samples of the infective agent during an outbreak in Oklahoma in 1985.

== Etiology ==
Bartonella henselae is a Gram-negative, rod-shaped bacterium that invades endothelial and red blood cells. One study showed Bartonella henselae invaded the mature blood cells of humans. It infects the host cell by sticking to it using trimeric autotransporter adhesins.

== Diagnosis ==
Bartonella henselae is a Gram-negative rod. It can be cultured in a lysis-centrifugation blood culture. The presence of bacteria can be detected by Warthin-Starry stain, or by a similar silver stain technique performed on infected tissue. A pan-Bartonella PCR detection is non-invasive and uses blood or biopsies to diagnose.

== Signs and symptoms ==
Bartonella henselae infection can appear up to 10 days after exposure to the microbe. Symptoms start with a papule at the site the microbe entered, followed by lymphadenopathy, usually in the axillary node. Half of patients also get aches, nausea, abdominal pain, and malaise. Many other complications can arise from this infection beyond the typical fever, lymphadenopathy, and general malaise. Immunocompromised people or patients who already have other conditions are at greater risk for further complications. Some cases have been found in children who had previous heart-valve disease; these children got endocarditis from B. henselae infection. Some patients had hepatosplenic involvement, myalgia, and arthritis after exposure to B. henselae. In rare cases, osteomyelitis, an infection in the bone, can be a manifestation of B. henselae.

== Treatment ==
No definite treatment regimen is known for a patient infected with B. henselae. Treatment depends on the wide range of symptoms that present. In most cases, it will resolve on its own in four to six weeks. Aminoglycosides in laboratory tests showed some bactericidal activity. Bacteriostatic antibiotics are not able to easily get through to intracellular Bartonella, so they are not recommended. In immunocompromised patients, pain medication is often prescribed. Nodes may need to be aspirated if painful, microabscesses often form, the abscess needs to be aspirated in many places to remove all the exudate. Because of chronic sinus tract formation risks, the nodes should not be incised to be drained. Azithromycin can be used for lymphadenopathy, which is enlarged or swollen lymph nodes.

== Prevention ==
Regular flea control measures, such as using flea preventatives on cats, are essential to reduce the risk of Bartonella henselae transmission. Practicing proper hygiene, including washing hands after handling cats and avoiding rough play with kittens, can further minimize exposure. Additionally, immunocompromised individuals should take extra precautions by limiting contact with young cats and avoiding direct exposure to cat saliva.

== See also ==
- BH11960
