= Αr45 RNA =

αr45 is a family of bacterial small non-coding RNAs with representatives in a broad group of α-proteobacteria from the order Hyphomicrobiales. The first member of this family (Smr45C) was found in a Sinorhizobium meliloti 1021 locus located in the chromosome (C). Further homology and structure conservation analysis identified homologs in several nitrogen-fixing symbiotic rhizobia (i.e. S. medicae, S. fredii, Rhizobium leguminosarum bv.viciae, R. leguminosarum bv. trifolii, R. etli, and several Mesorhizobium species), in the plant pathogens belonging to Agrobacterium species (i.e. A. tumefaciens, A. vitis, A. radiobacter, and Agrobacterium H13) as well as in a broad spectrum of Brucella species (B. ovis, B. canis, B. abortus and B. microtis, and several biovars of B. melitensis), in Bartonella species (i.e. B. henselae, B. clarridgeiae, B. tribocorum, B. quintana, B. bacilliformis, B. grahamii), in several members of the Xanthobactereacea family (i.e. Azorhizobium caulinodans, Starkey novella, Xhantobacter autotrophicus), and in some representatives of the Beijerinckiaceae family (i.e. Methylocella silvestris, Beijerinckia indica subsp. indica). αr45C RNA species are 147-153 nt long (Table 1) and share a well defined common secondary structure (Figure 1). All of the αr45 transcripts can be catalogued as trans-acting sRNAs expressed from well-defined promoter regions of independent transcription units within intergenic regions (IGRs) of the α-proteobacterial genomes (Figure 5).

== Discovery and Structure ==
Smr45C sRNA was described by del Val et al., as a result of a computational comparative genomic approach in the intergenic regions (IGRs) of the reference S. meliloti 1021 strain (http://iant.toulouse.inra.fr/bacteria/annotation/cgi/rhime.cgi) . Northern hybridization experiments confirmed that the predicted smr45C locus did express a single transcript of 130-179 nt length, which accumulated differentially in free-living and endosymbiotic bacteria. TAP-based 5'-RACE experiments mapped the transcription start site (TSS) of the full-length Smr45C transcript to the 3,105,445 nt position in the S. meliloti 1021 genome (http://iant.toulouse.inra.fr/bacteria/annotation/cgi/rhime.cgi) whereas the 3'-end was initially assumed to be located at the 3,105,265 nt position matching the last residue of a short stretch of Us (Figure 2) of a putative, but low-rated, Rho-independent terminator. Recent deep sequencing-based characterization of the small RNA fraction (50-350 nt) of S. meliloti 2011 further confirmed the expression of Smr45C (here referred to as SmelC706), and mapped the full-length transcript to the same 5' end and to the 3' end position 3,105,298.

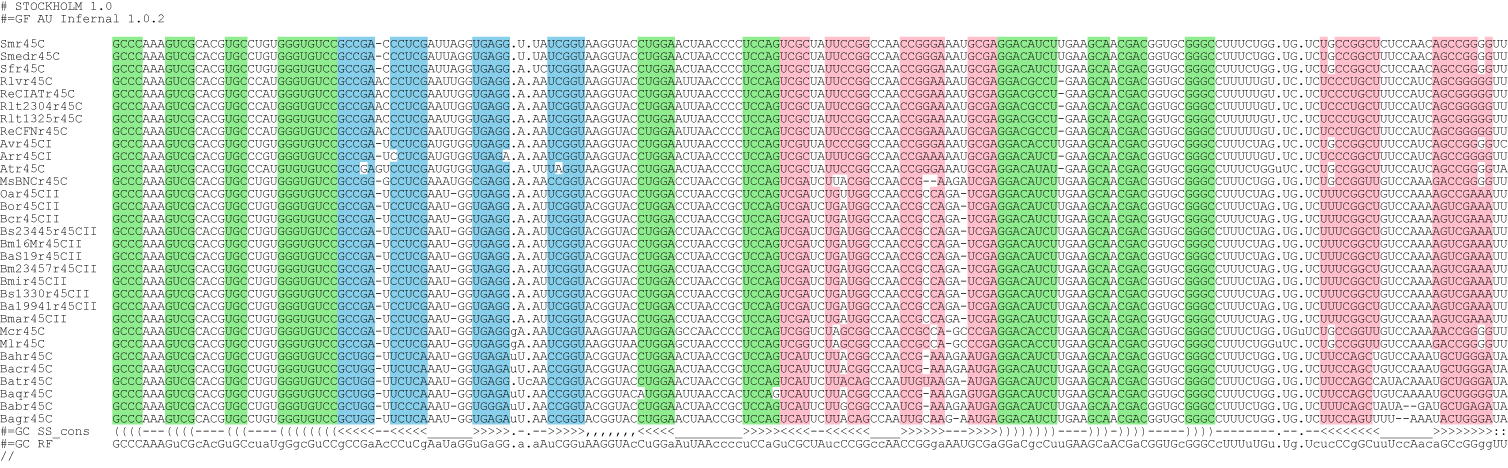
Figure 1: Covariance Model in stockholm format showing the consensus structure for the αr45 family. Each of the stems represented by the structure line #=GC SS_cons is in a different color. Covariance Model in stockholm format can be downloaded here.

The nucleotide sequence of Smr45C was initially used as query to search against the Rfam database (version 10.0; https://www.sanger.ac.uk/Software/Rfam). This homology search rendered no matches to known bacterial sRNA in this database. Smr45C was next BLASTed with default parameters against all the currently available bacterial genomes (1,615 sequences at 20 April 2011; https://www.ncbi.nlm.nih.gov). The regions exhibiting significant homology to the query sequence (78-89% similarity) were extracted to create a Covariance Model (CM) from a seed alignment using Infernal (version1.0) (Figure 2). This CM was used in a further search for new members of the αr45 family in the existing bacterial genomic databases.

Table 1: αr45 homologs in other symbionts and pathogens
CM model	Name	GI accession number	begin	end	strand	%GC	length	Organism
αr45	Smr45C	gi|15963753|ref|NC_003047.1|	3105265	3105445	-	59	148	Sinorhizobium meliloti 1021
αr45	Smedr45C	gi|150395228|ref|NC_009636.1|	2892729	2892909	-	59	148	Sinorhizobium medicae WSM419 chromosome
αr45	Sfr45C	gi|227820587|ref|NC_012587.1|	3069095	3069275	-	59	148	Sinorhizobium fredii NGR234 chromosome
αr45	Atr45C	gi|159185562|ref|NC_003063.2|	205601	205782	-	57	148	Agrobacterium tumefaciens str. C58 chromosome linear
αr45	ReCIATr45C	gi|190889639|ref|NC_010994.1|	3953756	3953936	-	59	148	Rhizobium etli CIAT 652
αr45	Arr45CI	gi|222084201|ref|NC_011985.1|	3124263	3124442	-	57	147	Agrobacterium radiobacter K84 chromosome 1
αr45	Rlt2304r45C	gi|209547612|ref|NC_011369.1|	3504209	3504389	-	59	148	Rhizobium leguminosarum bv. trifolii WSM2304
αr45	Avr45CI	gi|222147015|ref|NC_011989.1|	3166967	3167147	-	59	148	Agrobacterium vitis S4 chromosome 1
αr45	Rlvr45C	gi|116249766|ref|NC_008380.1|	4405210	4405390	-	59	148	Rhizobium leguminosarum bv. viciae 3841
αr45	Rlt1325r45C	gi|241202755|ref|NC_012850.1|	3739371	3739551	-	59	148	Rhizobium leguminosarum bv. trifolii WSM1325
αr45	ReCFNr45C	gi|86355669|ref|NC_007761.1|	3840978	3841158	-	59	148	Rhizobium etli CFN 42
αr45	Mlr45C	gi|57165207|ref|NC_002678.2|	2390687	2390867	-	62	147	Mesorhizobium loti MAFF303099 chromosome
αr45	Mcr45C	gi|319779749|ref|NC_014923.1|	1999110	1999290	+	63	147	Mesorhizobium ciceri biovar biserrulae WSM1271 chromosome
αr45	Bcr45CII	gi|161620094|ref|NC_010104.1|	97148	97326	+	60	143	Brucella canis ATCC 23365 chromosome II
αr45	Bs23445r45CII	gi|163844199|ref|NC_010167.1|	97254	97432	+	60	146	Brucella suis ATCC 23445 chromosome II
αr45	Bm16Mr45CII	gi|17988344|ref|NC_003318.1|	1172651	1172829	-	60	146	Brucella melitensis bv. 1 str. 16M chromosome II
αr45	BaS19r45CII	gi|189022234|ref|NC_010740.1|	96948	97126	+	60	146	Brucella abortus S19 chromosome 2
αr45	Bm23457r45CII	gi|225685871|ref|NC_012442.1|	97129	97307	+	60	146	Brucella melitensis ATCC 23457 chromosome II
αr45	Bs1330r45CII	gi|56968493|ref|NC_004311.2|	97128	97306	+	60	146	Brucella suis 1330 chromosome II
αr45	Ba19941r45CII	gi|62316961|ref|NC_006933.1|	96885	97063	+	60	146	Brucella abortus bv. 1 str. 9-941 chromosome II
αr45	Bmar45CII	gi|83268957|ref|NC_007624.1|	96950	97128	+	60	146	Brucella melitensis biovar Abortus 2308 chromosome II
αr45	Bor45CII	gi|148557829|ref|NC_009504.1|	96814	96992	+	60	146	Brucella ovis ATCC 25840 chromosome II
αr45	Bmir45CII	gi|256014795|ref|NC_013118.1|	97102	97280	+	60	146	Brucella microti CCM 4915 chromosome 2
αr45	Oar45CII	gi|153010078|ref|NC_009668.1|	1673505	1673683	-	60	146	Brucella anthropi ATCC 49188 chromosome 2
αr45	MsBNCr45C	gi|110632362|ref|NC_008254.1|	2952752	2952930	+	60	146	Mesorhizobium sp. BNC1
αr45	Bahr45C	gi|49474831|ref|NC_005956.1|	1421835	1422014	-	54	147	Bartonella henselae str. Houston-1
αr45	Bacr45C	gi|319898193|ref|NC_014932.1|	1277567	1277776	-	54	147	Bartonella clarridgeiae 73
αr45	Batr45C	gi|163867306|ref|NC_010161.1|	1865843	1866022	-	54	147	Bartonella tribocorum CIP 105476
αr45	Baqr45C	gi|49473688|ref|NC_005955.1|	1185140	1185319	-	53	147	Bartonella quintana str. Toulouse
αr45	Babr45C	gi|121601635|ref|NC_008783.1|	1120052	1120229	-	56	147	Bartonella bacilliformis KC583
αr45	Bagr45C	gi|240849682|ref|NC_012846.1|	1761390	1761567	-	53	147	Bartonella grahamii as4aup
αr45	Acr45C	gi|158421624|ref|NC_009937.1|	385443	385629	-	64	154	Azorhizobium caulinodans ORS 571
αr45	Stnr45C	gi|298290017|ref|NC_014217.1|	4175745	4175703	+	65	156	Starkeya novella DSM 506 chromosome
αr45	Xar45C	gi|154243958|ref|NC_009720.1|	2404335	2404523	-	63	156	Xanthobacter autotrophicus Py2 chromosome
αr45	Mesr45C	gi|217976200|ref|NC_011666.1|	1244610	1244795	-	64	155	Methylocella silvestris BL2 chromosome
αr45	Beir45C	gi|182677002|ref|NC_010581.1|	1241316	1241498	-	61	153	Beijerinckia indica subsp. indica ATCC 9039 chromosome

The results were manually inspected to deduce a consensus secondary structure for the family (Figure 1 and Figure 2). The consensus structure was also independently predicted with the program locARNATE with very similar predictions. The manual inspection of the sequences found with the CM using Infernal allowed finding 39 closer homolog sequences, all of them present as single chromosomal copies in the α-proteobacterial genomes. The rhizobial species encoding these homologs to Smr45C were: S. medicae and S. fredii, two R. leguminosarum trifolii strains (WSM304 and WSM35), two R. etli strains CFN 42 and CIAT 652, the reference R. leguminosarum bv. viciae 3841 strain, and the Agrobacterium species A. vitis,A. tumefaciens, A. radiobacter and A. H13, Brucella species (B. ovis, B. canis, B. abortus, B. microtis, and several biobars of B. melitensis), Brucella anthropi, the Mesorhizobium species loti, M. ciceri and M. BNC., Bartonella species (i.e. B. henselae, B. clarridgeiae, B. tribocorum, B. quintana, B. bacilliformis, B. grahamii). All these sequences showed significant Infernal E-values (8.93E-40 – 6.12E-36) and bit-scores. The rest of the sequences found with the model showed high E-values between (3.28E-06 and 4.56E-04) but lower bit-scores and are encoded by several members of the Xanthobactereacea family (i.e. A. caulinodans, Sa. novella, X. autotrophicus), Me. silvestris, and Be. indica subsp. indica.

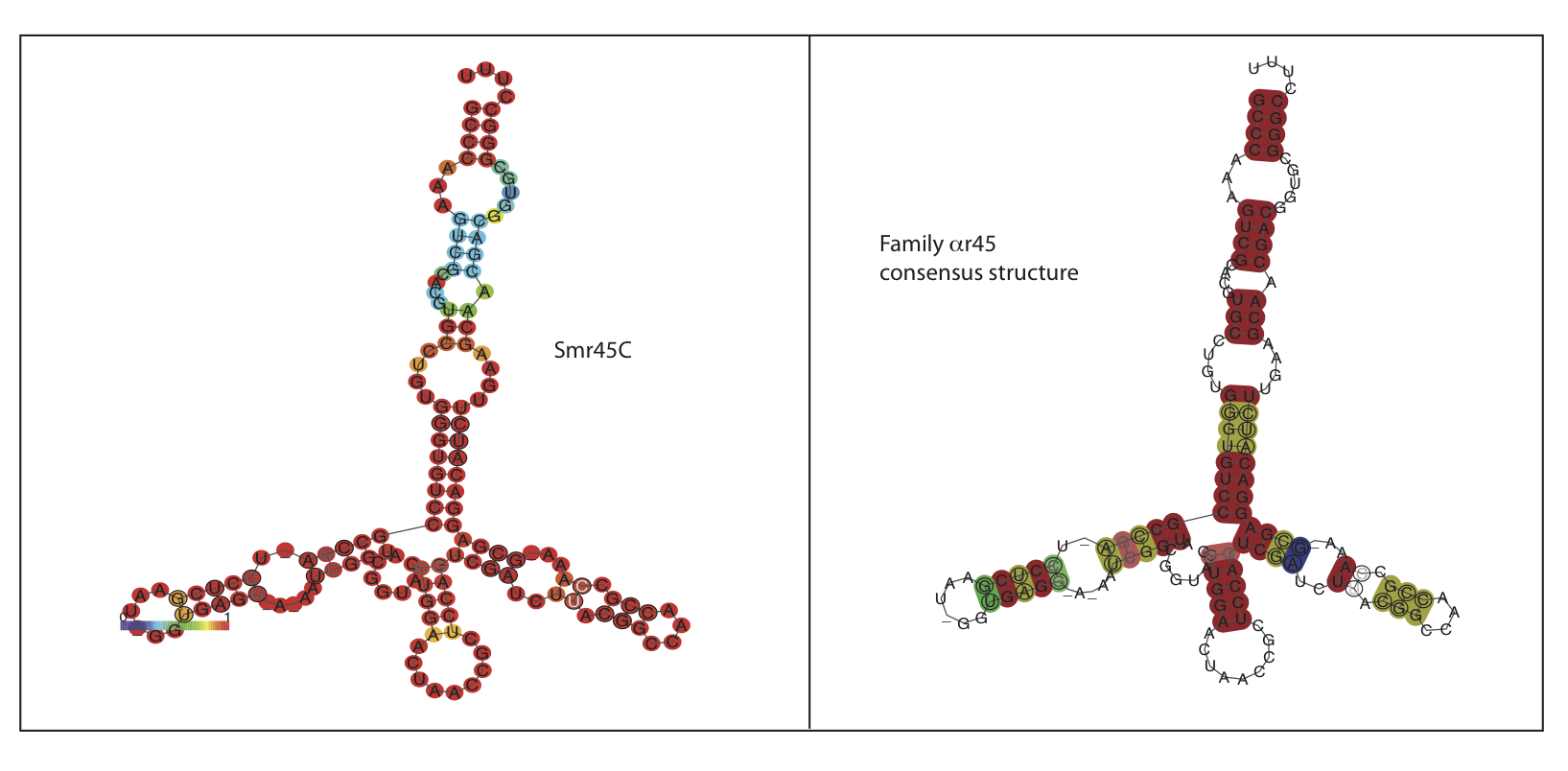
Figure 2: Consensus secondary structure of Smr45C and the ar45 family predicted by RNA and RNAalifold. The color scheme of Smr45C represent the base pair probabilities. The coloring scheme for the ar45 family structure is based on base pairs conservation: Red: base pair occurring in all sequences used to generate the consensus; yellow: two types of base pairing occur; Green: three types of base pairing occur. The shading of base pairs represents: Saturated, no inconsistent sequences; Pale, one inconsistent sequence; Very pale, two inconsistent sequences. The gene strand is represented with the file direction.

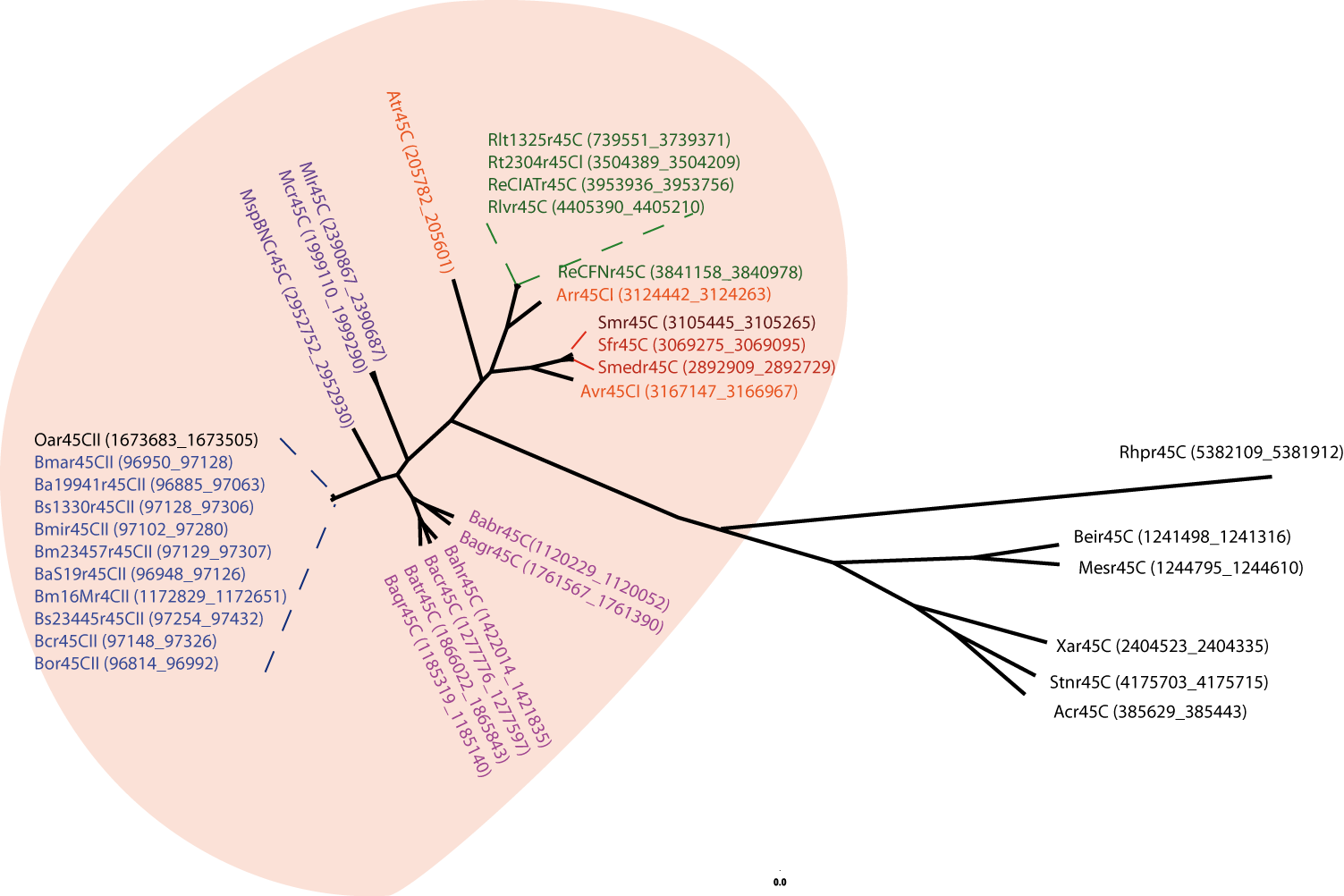
Figure 3: Phylogenetic distribution of known and predicted αr45 genes. Gene numbers are based on computational analysis using the program Infernal. Legend: Smr45C = Sinorhizobium meliloti 1021 (NC_003047), Smedr45C = Sinorhizobium medicae WSM419 chromosome (NC_009636), Sfr45C = Sinorhizobium fredii NGR234 chromosome (NC_012587), Atr45C = Agrobacterium tumefaciens str. C58 chromosome linear (NC_003063), ReCIATr45C = Rhizobium etli CIAT 652 (NC_010994), Arr45C = Agrobacterium radiobacter K84 chromosome 1 (NC_011985), Rlt2304r45C = Rhizobium leguminosarum bv. trifolii WSM2304 (NC_011369), Avr45C = Agrobacterium vitis S4 chromosome 1 (NC_011989), Rlvr45C = Rhizobium leguminosarum bv. viciae 3841 (NC_008380), Rlt1325r45C = Rhizobium leguminosarum bv. trifolii WSM1325 (NC_012850), ReCFNr45C = Rhizobium etli CFN 42 (NC_007761), Mlr45C = Mesorhizobium loti MAFF303099 chromosome (NC_002678), Mcr45C = Mesorhizobium ciceri biovar biserrulae WSM1271 chromosome (NC_014923), Bcr45CII = Brucella canis ATCC 23365 chromosome II (NC_010104), Bs23445r45CII = Brucella suis ATCC 23445 chromosome II (NC_010167), Bm16Mr45CII = Brucella melitensis bv. 1 str. 16M chromosome II (NC_003318), BaS19r45CII = Brucella abortus S19 chromosome 2 (NC_010740), Bm23457r45CII = Brucella melitensis ATCC 23457 chromosome II (NC_012442), Bs1330r45CII = Brucella suis 1330 chromosome II (NC_004311), Ba19941r45CII = Brucella abortus bv. 1 str. 9-941 chromosome II (NC_006933), Bmar45CII = Brucella melitensis biovar Abortus 2308 chromosome II (NC_007624), Bor45CII = Brucella ovis ATCC 25840 chromosome II (NC_009504), Bmir45CII = Brucella microti CCM 4915 chromosome 2 (NC_013118), Oar45C = Brucella anthropi ATCC 49188 chromosome 2 (NC_009668), MsBNCr45C = Mesorhizobium sp. BNC1 (NC_008254), Bahr45C = Bartonella henselae str. Houston-1 (NC_005956), Bacr45C = Bartonella clarridgeiae 73 (NC_014932), Batr45C = Bartonella tribocorum CIP 105476 (NC_010161), Baqr45C = Bartonella quintana str. Toulouse (NC_005955), Babr45C = Bartonella bacilliformis KC583 (NC_008783), Bagr45C = Bartonella grahamii as4aup (NC_012846), Ac571r45C = Azorhizobium caulinodans ORS 571 (NC_009937), Stnr45C = Starkeya novella DSM 506 chromosome (NC_014217), Xar45C = Xanthobacter autotrophicus Py2 chromosome (NC_009720), Mesr45C = Methylocella silvestris BL2 chromosome (NC_011666), Beir45C = Beijerinckia indica subsp. indica ATCC 9039 chromosome (NC_010581), Rhpr45C = Rhodopseudomonas palustris BisA53 chromosome (NC_008435).

== Expression information ==
The expression of Smr45C in S. meliloti 1021 was assessed under different biological conditions; i.e. bacterial growth in TY, minimal medium (MM) and luteolin-MM broth and endosymbiotic bacteria (i.e. mature symbiotic alfalfa nodules). The expression of Smr45C in free-living bacteria was found to be growth-dependent, being the gene strongly down-regulated when bacteria entered the stationary phase. However, luteolin moderately stimulated the expression of Smr45C (2-fold) but the gene was not detectable in endosymbiotic bacteria.

Recent co-inmuno precipitation experiments corroborate that Smr45C, does bind the bacterial protein Hfq for efficient target binding.

== Promoter Analysis ==
All the promoter regions of the αr45 family members examined so far are very conserved in a sequence stretch extending up to 80 bp upstream of the transcription start site of the sRNA. All closest homolog loci have recognizable σ^{70}-dependent promoters showing a -35/-10 consensus motif CTTAGAC-n17-CTATAT, which has been previously shown to be widely conserved among several other genera in the α-subgroup of proteobacteria. To identify binding sites for other known transcription factors we used the fasta sequences provided by RegPredict(http://regpredict.lbl.gov/regpredict/help.html), and used those position weight matrices (PSWM) provided by RegulonDB (http://regulondb.ccg.unam.mx). We built PSWM for each transcription factor from the RegPredict sequences using the Consensus/Patser program, choosing the best final matrix for motif lengths between 14 and 30 bps a threshold average E-value < 10E-10 for each matrix was established, (see "Thresholded consensus" in http://gps-tools2.its.yale.edu). Moreover, we searched for conserved unknown motifs using MEME (http://meme.sdsc.edu/meme4_6_1/intro.html) and used relaxed regular expressions (i.e. pattern matching) over all Smr45C homologs promoters.

This study predicts differences in the regulation of the expression of the αr45 representatives in the different α-proteobacterial species. The Sinorhizobium, Rhizobium, and Agrobacterium groups presented a very well conserved motif that matches the consensus sequence recognized by the maltose repressor Mall. Furthermore, the promoters of the αr45 members of the . Furthermore, the promoters of the αr45 members of the Sinorhizobium group presented an additional conserved region between positions -60 and -85 (boxed in orange in Figure 4), with significant similarity to the matrix SMb21598_Rhizobiales from Reg_Predict. This binding site corresponds to a transcriptional regulator of the LacI family. The Rhizobium group, presented also a well conserved motif in this region for which no significant similarity could be found (marked in green in Figure 4). This analysis also revealed an extended conserved sequence stretch among the promoters of the Brucella and Bartonella αr45 sRNA loci, but no known transcription factor binding sites were recognizable in these motifs.

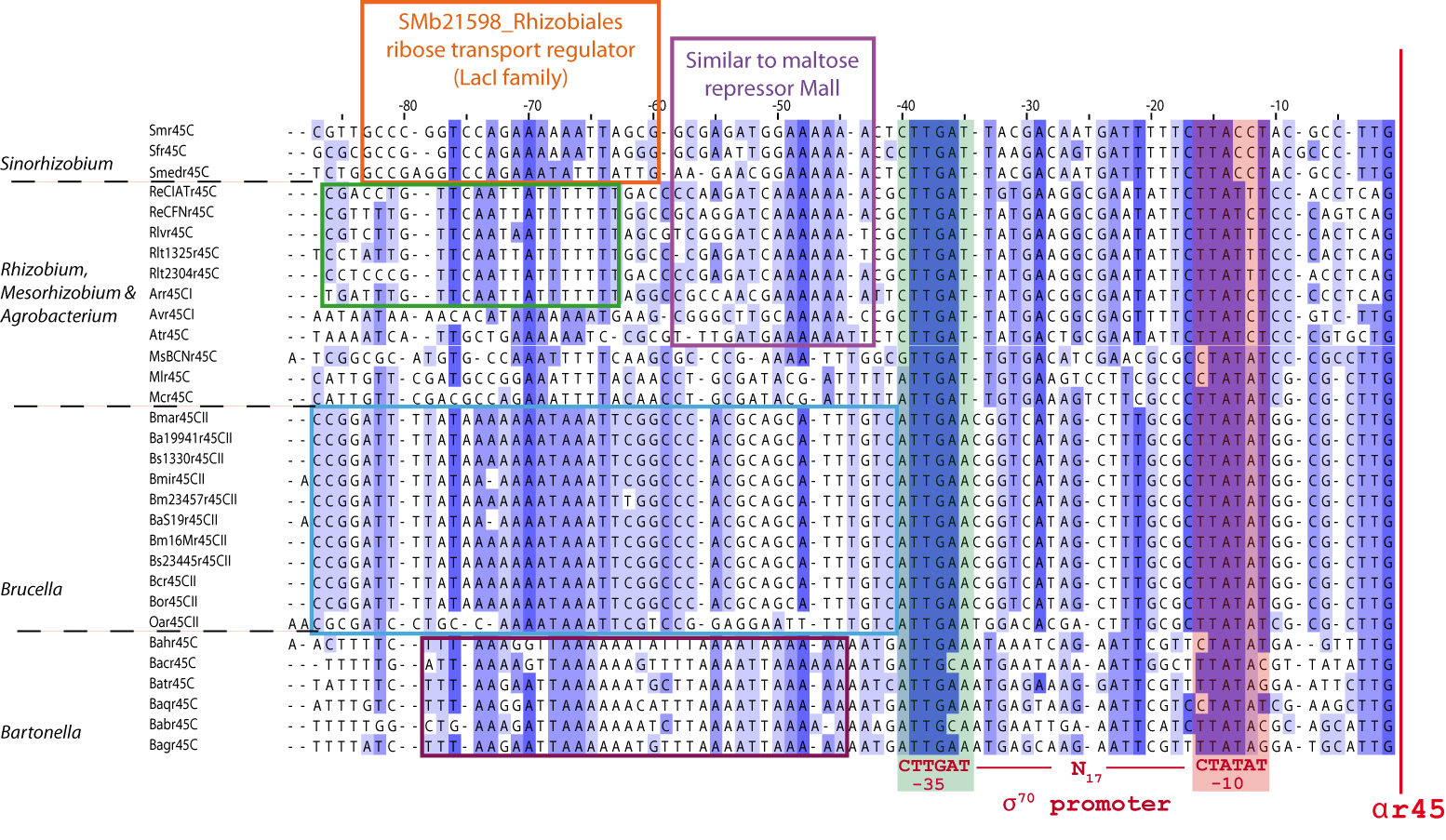
Figure 4: Alignment of the promoter region of αr45 members. All members presented putative σ^{70} promoters with -35 and -10 boxes marked in green and red respectively.

== Genomic Context ==
All members of the αr45 family are trans-encoded sRNAs transcribed from independent promoters in chromosomal IGRs. Most of the neighboring genes of the seed alignment's members were not annotated and thus were further manually curated. The genomic regions of the αr45 sRNAs from Sinorhizobium, Rhizobium, A. vitis and A. radiobacter exhibited a great degree of conservation including the upstream and downstream genes which have been predicted to code for a LysR family transcriptional regulator and an ornithine descarboxilase, respectively (solo como aclaración, upstream and downstream se refieren al sentido de transcripción). Partial synteny of the αr45 genomic regions was observed in the Mesorhizobium and Brucella species where instead of aLysR family transcriptional regulator' gene an amidase coding gene was found. In Bartonella species the αr45 upstream gene was always found to code for a protein containing a rhodanase domain. In the genomic regions of the αr45 homologs in more distantly related α-proteobacteria (e.g. Starkeya, Metthylocella or Xanthobacter species) synteny was restricted to the downstream ornithine descarboxylase gene.

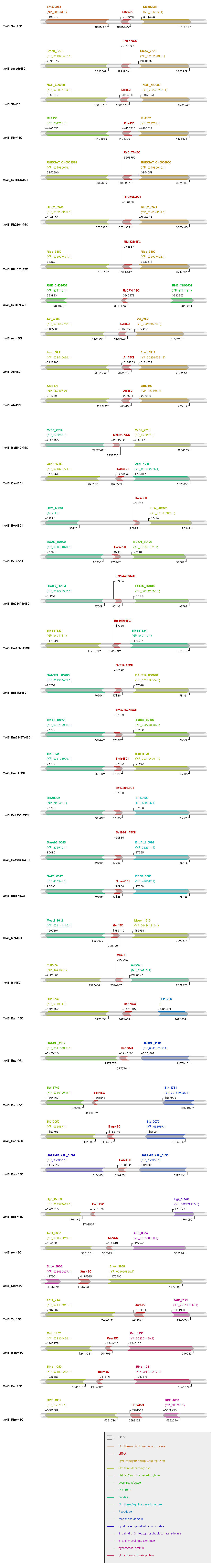
Figure 5: Genomic context scheme of Smr45C and its closest homologues in other organisms. The αr45 RNA genes are represented by red arrows and the flanking ORFs by arrows on different colors depending on their product function (legend). Numbers indicate the αr45 RNA gene's and flanking ORFs coordinates in each organism genome database. The gene strand is represented with the file direction. On the left of the figure identification names are used which correspond to a certain organism: αr45_Smr45C = Sinorhizobium meliloti 1021 (NC_003047), αr45_Smedr45C = Sinorhizobium medicae WSM419 chromosome (NC_009636), αr45_Sfr45C = Sinorhizobium fredii NGR234 chromosome (NC_012587), αr45_Atr45C = Agrobacterium tumefaciens str. C58 chromosome linear (NC_003063), αr45_ReCIATr45C = Rhizobium etli CIAT 652 (NC_010994), αr45_Arr45C = Agrobacterium radiobacter K84 chromosome 1 (NC_011985), αr45_Rlt2304r45C = Rhizobium leguminosarum bv. trifolii WSM2304 (NC_011369), αr45_Avr45C = Agrobacterium vitis S4 chromosome 1 (NC_011989), αr45_Rlvr45C = Rhizobium leguminosarum bv. viciae 3841 (NC_008380), αr45_Rlt1325r45C = Rhizobium leguminosarum bv. trifolii WSM1325 (NC_012850), αr45_ReCFNr45C = Rhizobium etli CFN 42 (NC_007761), αr45_Mlr45C = Mesorhizobium loti MAFF303099 chromosome (NC_002678), αr45_Mcr45C = Mesorhizobium ciceri biovar biserrulae WSM1271 chromosome (NC_014923), αr45_Bcr45CII = Brucella canis ATCC 23365 chromosome II (NC_010104), αr45_Bs23445r45CII = Brucella suis ATCC 23445 chromosome II (NC_010167), αr45_Bm16Mr45CII = Brucella melitensis bv. 1 str. 16M chromosome II (NC_003318), αr45_BaS19r45CII = Brucella abortus S19 chromosome 2 (NC_010740), αr45_Bm23457r45CII = Brucella melitensis ATCC 23457 chromosome II (NC_012442), αr45_Bs1330r45CII = Brucella suis 1330 chromosome II (NC_004311), αr45_Ba19941r45CII = Brucella abortus bv. 1 str. 9-941 chromosome II (NC_006933), αr45_Bmar45CII = Brucella melitensis biovar Abortus 2308 chromosome II (NC_007624), αr45_Bor45CII = Brucella ovis ATCC 25840 chromosome II (NC_009504), αr45_Bmir45CII = Brucella microti CCM 4915 chromosome 2 (NC_013118), αr45_Oar45C = Brucella anthropi ATCC 49188 chromosome 2 (NC_009668), αr45_MsBNCr45C = Mesorhizobium sp. BNC1 (NC_008254), αr45_Bahr45C = Bartonella henselae str. Houston-1 (NC_005956), αr45_Bacr45C = Bartonella clarridgeiae 73 (NC_014932), αr45_Batr45C = Bartonella tribocorum CIP 105476 (NC_010161), αr45_Baqr45C = Bartonella quintana str. Toulouse (NC_005955), αr45_Babr45C = Bartonella bacilliformis KC583 (NC_008783), αr45_Bagr45C = Bartonella grahamii as4aup (NC_012846), αr45_Ac571r45C = Azorhizobium caulinodans ORS 571 (NC_009937), αr45_Stnr45C = Starkeya novella DSM 506 chromosome (NC_014217), αr45_Xar45C = Xanthobacter autotrophicus Py2 chromosome (NC_009720), αr45_Mesr45C = Methylocella silvestris BL2 chromosome (NC_011666), αr45_Beir45C = Beijerinckia indica subsp. indica ATCC 9039 chromosome (NC_010581), αr45_Rhpr45C = Rhodopseudomonas palustris BisA53 chromosome (NC_008435).

Table 2: Detailed Genomic context information of the α45 sRNA members.
Family	Feature	Name	Strand	Begin	End	Protein name	Annotation	Organism
αr45	gene	SMc02983	R	3103912	3105051	NP_386981.1	Ornithine or Arginine decarboxylase	Sinorhizobium meliloti 1021 (NC_003047)
αr45	sRNA	Smr45C	R	3105265	3105445	-	-	Sinorhizobium meliloti 1021 (NC_003047)
αr45	gene	SMc02984	D	3105638	3106531	NP_386982.1	LysR family transcriptional regulator	Sinorhizobium meliloti 1021 (NC_003047)
αr45	gene	Smed_2772	R	2891376	2892509	YP_001328437.1	Ornithine decarboxylase	Sinorhizobium medicae WSM419 chromosome (NC_009636)
αr45	sRNA	Smedr45C	R	2892729	2892909	-	-	Sinorhizobium medicae WSM419 chromosome (NC_009636)
αr45	gene	Smed_2773	D	2893045	2893959	YP_001328438.1	LysR family transcriptional regulator	Sinorhizobium medicae WSM419 chromosome (NC_009636)
αr45	gene	NGR_c29260	R	3067740	3068873	YP_002827423.1	Ornithine decarboxylase	Sinorhizobium fredii NGR234 chromosome(NC_012587)
αr45	sRNA	Sfr45C	R	3069095	3069275	-	-	Sinorhizobium fredii NGR234 chromosome (NC_012587)
αr45	gene	NGR_c29280	D	3069481	3070374	YP_002827424.1	LysR family transcriptional regulator	Sinorhizobium fredii NGR234 chromosome (NC_012587)
αr45	gene	RL4156	R	4403850	4404983	YP_769731.1	Lysine-Ornithine decarboxylase	Rhizobium leguminosarum bv viciae 3841 (NC_008380)
αr45	sRNA	Rlvr45C	R	4405210	4405390	-	-	Rhizobium leguminosarum bv viciae 3841 (NC_008380)
αr45	gene	RL4157	D	4405512	4406405	YP_769732.1	LysR family transcriptional regulator	Rhizobium leguminosarum bv viciae 3841 (NC_008380)
αr45	gene	RHECIAT_CH0003899	R	3952396	3953529	YP_001980014.1	Ornithine decarboxylase	Rhizobium etli CIAT 652 (NC_010994)
αr45	sRNA	ReCIATr45C	R	3953756	3953936	-	-	Rhizobium etli CIAT 652 (NC_010994)
αr45	gene	RHECIAT_CH0003900	D	3954059	3954952	YP_001980015.1	LysR family transcriptional regulator	Rhizobium etli CIAT 652 (NC_010994)
αr45	gene	Rleg2_3390	R	3502850	3503983	YP_002282883.1	Ornithine decarboxylase	Rhizobium leguminosarum bv trifolii WSM2304 (NC_011369)
αr45	sRNA	Rlt2304r45C	R	3504209	3504389	-	-	Rhizobium leguminosarum bv trifolii WSM2304 (NC_011369)
αr45	gene	Rleg2_3391	D	3504512	3505405	YP_002282884.1	LysR family transcriptional regulator	Rhizobium leguminosarum bv trifolii WSM2304 (NC_011369)
αr45	gene	Rleg_3689	R	3738011	3739144	YP_002977471.1	Ornithine decarboxylase	Rhizobium leguminosarum bv trifolii WSM1325 (NC_012850)
αr45	sRNA	Rlt1325r45C	R	3739371	3739551	-	-	Rhizobium leguminosarum bv trifolii WSM1325 (NC_012850)
αr45	gene	Rleg_3690	D	3739671	3740564	YP_002977472.1	LysR family transcriptional regulator	Rhizobium leguminosarum bv trifolii WSM1325 (NC_012850)
αr45	gene	RHE_CH03628	R	3838931	3839521	YP_471110.1	acetyltransferase	Rhizobium etli CFN 42 (NC_007761)
αr45	sRNA	ReCFNr45C	R	3840978	3841158	-	-	Rhizobium etli CFN 42 (NC_007761)
αr45	gene	RHE_CH03631	D	3842303	3842944	YP_471113.1	DUF1007	Rhizobium etli CFN 42 (NC_007761)
αr45	gene	Avi_3806	R	3165600	3166733	YP_002550752.1	Ornithine decarboxylase	Agrobacterium vitis S4 chromosome 1 (NC_011989)
αr45	sRNA	Avr45CI	R	3166967	3167147	-	-	Agrobacterium vitis S4 chromosome 1 (NC_011989)
αr45	gene	Avi_3808	D	3167282	3168211	YP_002550753.1	LysR family transcriptional regulator	Agrobacterium vitis S4 chromosome 1 (NC_011989)
αr45	gene	Arad_3911	R	3122903	3124036	YP_002545680.1	Ornithine decarboxylase	Agrobacterium radiobacter K84 chromosome 1 (NC_011985)
αr45	sRNA	Arr45CI	R	3124263	3124442	-	-	Agrobacterium radiobacter K84 chromosome 1 (NC_011985)
αr45	gene	Arad_3912	D	3124569	3125462	YP_002545681.1	LysR family transcriptional regulator	Agrobacterium radiobacter K84 chromosome 1 (NC_011985)
αr45	gene	Atu3196	R	204249	205382	NP_357406.2	Ornithine decarboxylase	Agrobacterium tumefaciens str. C58 chromosome linear (NC_003063)
αr45	sRNA	Atr45C	R	205601	205782	-	-	Agrobacterium tumefaciens str. C58 chromosome linear (NC_003063)
αr45	gene	Atu3197	D	205919	206812	NP_357405.2	LysR family transcriptional regulator	Agrobacterium tumefaciens str. C58 chromosome linear (NC_003063)
αr45	gene	Meso_2714	R	2951455	2952642	YP_675256.1	amidase	Mesorhizobium sp. BNC1 (NC_008254)
αr45	sRNA	MsBNCr45C	D	2952752	2952930	-	-	Mesorhizobium sp. BNC1 (NC_008254)
αr45	gene	Meso_2715	D	2953176	2954309	YP_675257.1	Ornithine decarboxylase	Mesorhizobium sp. BNC1 (NC_008254)
αr45	gene	Oant_4245	R	1672055	1673188	YP_001372774.1	Ornithine decarboxylase	Brucella anthropi ATCC 49188 chromosome 2 (NC_009668)
αr45	sRNA	Oar45CII	R	1673505	1673683	-	-	Brucella anthropi ATCC 49188 chromosome 2 (NC_009668)
αr45	gene	Oant_4246	D	1673866	1675053	YP_001372775.1	amidase	Brucella anthropi ATCC 49188 chromosome 2 (NC_009668)
αr45	gene	BOV_A0091	R	94529	95420	A5VTL3	amidase	Brucella ovis ATCC 25840 chromosome II (NC_009504)
αr45	sRNA	Bor45CII	D	96814	96992	-	-	Brucella ovis ATCC 25840 chromosome II (NC_009504)
αr45	gene	BOV_A0092	D	97214	98347	YP_001257169.1	Ornithine decarboxylase	Brucella ovis ATCC 25840 chromosome II (NC_009504)
αr45	sRNA	Bcr45CII	D	97148	97326	-	-	Brucella canis ATCC 23365 chromosome II (NC_010104)
αr45	gene	BCAN_B0102	R	95758	96963	YP_001594073.1	amidase	Brucella canis ATCC 23365 chromosome II (NC_010104)
αr45	gene	BCAN_B0104	D	97548	98681	YP_001594074.1	Lysine-Ornithine decarboxylase	Brucella canis ATCC 23365 chromosome II (NC_010104)
αr45I	sRNA	Bs23445r45CII	D	97254	97432	-	-	Brucella suis ATCC 23445 chromosome II (NC_010167)
αr45	gene	BSUIS_B0104	R	95864	97069	YP_001621952.1	amidase	Brucella suis ATCC 23445 chromosome II (NC_010167)
αr45	gene	BSUIS_B0106	D	97654	98787	YP_001621953.1	Lysine-Ornithine decarboxylase	Brucella suis ATCC 23445 chromosome II (NC_010167)
αr45	sRNA	Bm16Mr45CII	R	1172651	1172829	-	-	Brucella melitensis bv. 1 str. 16M chromosome II (NC_003318)
αr45	gene	BMEII1133	R	1171296	1172429	NP_542111.1	Ornithine decarboxylase	Brucella melitensis bv. 1 str. 16M chromosome II (NC_003318)
αr45	gene	BMEII1134	D	1173014	1174219	NP_542112.1	amidase	Brucella melitensis bv. 1 str. 16M chromosome II (NC_003318)
αr45	sRNA	BaS19r45CII	D	96948	97126	-	-	Brucella abortus S19 chromosome 2 (NC_010740)
αr45	gene	BAbS19_II00900	R	95559	96764	YP_001932063.1	amidase	Brucella abortus S19 chromosome 2 (NC_010740)
αr45	gene	BAbS19_II00910	D	97348	98481	YP_001932064.1	Ornithine decarboxylase	Brucella abortus S19 chromosome 2 (NC_010740)
αr45	sRNA	Bm23457r45CII	D	97129	97307	-	-	Brucella melitensis ATCC 23457 chromosome II (NC_012442)
αr45	gene	BMEA_B0101	R	95739	96944	YP_002733935.1	amidase	Brucella melitensis ATCC 23457 chromosome II (NC_012442)
αr45	gene	BMEA_B0103	D	97529	98662	YP_002733936.1	Lysine-Ornithine decarboxylase	Brucella melitensis ATCC 23457 chromosome II (NC_012442)
αr45	sRNA	Bmir45CII	D	97102	97280	-	-	Brucella microti CCM 4915 chromosome 2 (NC_013118)
αr45	gene	BMI_II99	R	95713	96918	YP_003104900.1	amidase	Brucella microti CCM 4915 chromosome 2 (NC_013118)
αr45	gene	BMI_II100	D	97502	98635	YP_003104901.1	Ornithine decarboxylase	Brucella microti CCM 4915 chromosome 2 (NC_013118)
αr45	sRNA	Bs1330r45CII	D	97128	97306	-	-	Brucella suis 1330 chromosome II (NC_004311)
αr45	gene	BRA0099	R	95738	96943	NP_699304.1	amidase	Brucella suis 1330 chromosome II (NC_004311)
αr45	gene	BRA0100	D	97528	98661	NP_699305.1	Ornithine Arginine decarboxylase	Brucella suis 1330 chromosome II (NC_004311)
αr45	sRNA	Ba19941r45CII	D	96885	97063	-	-	Brucella abortus bv. 1 str. 9-941 chromosome II (NC_006933)
αr45	gene	BruAb2_0098	R	95495	96700	YP_222910.1	amidase	Brucella abortus bv. 1 str. 9-941 chromosome II (NC_006933)
αr45	gene	BruAb2_0099	D	97285	98418	YP_222911.1	Ornithine Arginine decarboxylase	Brucella abortus bv. 1 str. 9-941 chromosome II (NC_006933)
αr45	sRNA	Bmar45CII	D	96950	97128	-	-	Brucella melitensis biovar Abortus 2308 chromosome II (NC_007624)
αr45	gene	BAB2_0097	R	95560	96765	YP_418341.1	amidase	Brucella melitensis biovar Abortus 2308 chromosome II (NC_007624)
αr45	gene	BAB2_0098	D	97350	98483	YP_418342.1	Ornithine Arginine decarboxylase	Brucella melitensis biovar Abortus 2308 chromosome II (NC_007624)
αr45	gene	Mesci_1912	R	1997804	1999000	YP_004141115.1	amidase	Mesorhizobium ciceri biovar biserrulae WSM1271 chromosome (NC_014923)
αr45	sRNA	Mcr45C	D	1999110	1999290	-	-	Mesorhizobium ciceri biovar biserrulae WSM1271 chromosome (NC_014923)
αr45	gene	Mesci_1913	D	1999541	2000674	YP_004141116.1	Ornithine decarboxylase	Mesorhizobium ciceri biovar biserrulae WSM1271 chromosome (NC_014923)
αr45	gene	mll2974	R	2389301	2390434	NP_104188.1	Ornithine decarboxylase	Mesorhizobium loti MAFF303099 chromosome (NC_002678)
αr45	sRNA	Mlr45C	R	2390687	2390867	-	-	Mesorhizobium loti MAFF303099 chromosome (NC_002678)
αr45	gene	mlr2975	D	2390977	2392173	NP_104189.1	amidase	Mesorhizobium loti MAFF303099 chromosome (NC_002678)
αr45	gene	BH12730	R	1420457	1421590	YP_034014.1	Ornithine decarboxylase	Bartonella henselae str. Houston-1 (NC_005956)
αr45	sRNA	Bahr45C	R	1421835	1422014	-	-	Bartonella henselae str. Houston-1 (NC_005956)
αr45	gene	BH12750	D	1422471	1423014		Pseudogen	Bartonella henselae str. Houston-1 (NC_005956)
αr45	gene	BARCL_1139	R	1276216	1277577	YP_004159385.1	Lysine-Ornithine decarboxylase	Bartonella clarridgeiae 73 (NC_014932)
αr45	sRNA	Bacr45C	R	1277597	1277776	-	-	Bartonella clarridgeiae 73 (NC_014932)
αr45	gene	BARCL_1140	R	1278001	1278918	YP_004159386.1	rhodanese domain.	Bartonella clarridgeiae 73 (NC_014932)
αr45	gene	Btr_1749	R	1864467	1865600	YP_001610035.1	Lysine-Ornithine decarboxylase	Bartonella tribocorum CIP 105476 (NC_010161)
αr45	sRNA	Batr45C	R	1865843	1866022	-	-	Bartonella tribocorum CIP 105476 (NC_010161)
αr45	gene	Btr_1751	R	1867923	1868852	YP_001610036.1	rhodanese domain.	Bartonella tribocorum CIP 105476 (NC_010161)
αr45	gene	BQ10050	R	1183759	1184892	YP_032587.1	Ornithine decarboxylase	Bartonella quintana str. Toulouse (NC_005955)
αr45	sRNA	Baqr45C	R	1185140	1185319	-	-	Bartonella quintana str. Toulouse (NC_005955)
αr45	gene	BQ10070	R	1186001	1186915	YP_032589.1	rhodanese domain.	Bartonella quintana str. Toulouse (NC_005955)
αr45	sRNA	Babr45C	R	1120052	1120229	-	-	Bartonella bacilliformis KC583 (NC_008783)
αr45	gene	BARBAKC583_1090	R	1118676	1119809	YP_989352.1	pyridoxal-dependent decarboxylas	Bartonella bacilliformis KC583 (NC_008783)
αr45	gene	BARBAKC583_1091	R	1120463	1121380	YP_989353.1	rhodanese domain.	Bartonella bacilliformis KC583 (NC_008783)
αr45	sRNA	Bagr45C	R	1761390	1761567	-	-	Bartonella grahamii as4aup (NC_012846)
αr45	gene	Bgr_15560	R	1760016	1761149	YP_002972413.1	Ornithine decarboxylase	Bartonella grahamii as4aup (NC_012846)
αr45	gene	Bgr_15590	D	1763885	1764550	YP_002972415.1	2-dehydro-3-deoxyphosphogluconate aldolase	Bartonella grahamii as4aup (NC_012846)
αr45	gene	AZC_0333	R	384008	385138	YP_001523249.1	Ornithine decarboxylase	Azorhizobium caulinodans ORS 571 (NC_009937)
αr45	sRNA	Acr45C	R	385443	385629	-	-	Azorhizobium caulinodans ORS 571 (NC_009937)
αr45	gene	AZC_0334	D	386047	387324	YP_001523250.1	5-aminolevulinate synthase	Azorhizobium caulinodans ORS 571 (NC_009937)
αr45	gene	Snov_3938	D	4175011	4175250	YP_003695827.1	hypothetical protein	Starkeya novella DSM 506 chromosome (NC_014217)
αr45	sRNA	Stnr45C	D	4175515	4175703	-	-	Starkeya novella DSM 506 chromosome (NC_014217)
αr45	gene	Snov_3939	D	4175960	4177090	YP_003695828.1	Ornithine decarboxylase	Starkeya novella DSM 506 chromosome (NC_014217)
αr45	gene	Xaut_2140	R	2402902	2404032	YP_001417041.1	Ornithine decarboxylase	Xanthobacter autotrophicus Py2 chromosome (NC_009720)
αr45	sRNA	Xar45C	R	2404335	2404523	-	-	Xanthobacter autotrophicus Py2 chromosome (NC_009720)
αr45	gene	Xaut_2141	D	2404953	2405258	YP_001417042.1	hypothetical protein	Xanthobacter autotrophicus Py2 chromosome (NC_009720)
αr45	gene	Msil_1157	R	1243178	1244308	YP_002361488.1	Ornithine decarboxylase	Methylocella silvestris BL2 chromosome (NC_011666)
αr45	sRNA	Mesr45C	R	1244610	1244795	-	-	Methylocella silvestris BL2 chromosome (NC_011666)
αr45	gene	Msil_1158	D	1245160	1246743	YP_002361489.1	glucan biosynthesis protein	Methylocella silvestris BL2 chromosome (NC_011666)
αr45	gene	Bind_1080	R	1239883	1241013	YP_001832212.1	Ornithine decarboxylase	Beijerinckia indica subsp. indica ATCC 9039 chromosome (NC_010581)
αr45	sRNA	Beir45C	R	1241316	1241498	-	-	Beijerinckia indica subsp. indica ATCC 9039 chromosome (NC_010581)
αr45	gene	Bind_1081	D	1242373	1243974	YP_001832213.1	glucan biosynthesis protein	Beijerinckia indica subsp. indica ATCC 9039 chromosome (NC_010581)
αr45	gene	RPE_4802	R	5380582	5381724	YP_783701.1	Ornithine decarboxylase	Rhodopseudomonas palustris BisA53 chromosome (NC_008435)
αr45	sRNA	Rhpr45C	R	5381912	5382109	-	-	Rhodopseudomonas palustris BisA53 chromosome (NC_008435)
αr45	gene	RPE_4803	R	5382436	5382696	YP_783702.1	hypothetical protein	Rhodopseudomonas palustris BisA53 chromosome (NC_008435)
