= Bartonella acomydis =

Scientific classification
- Domain: Bacteria
- Kingdom: Pseudomonadati
- Phylum: Pseudomonadota
- Class: Alphaproteobacteria
- Order: Hyphomicrobiales
- Family: Bartonellaceae
- Genus: Bartonella
- Species: B. acomydis

Binomial name
- Bartonella acomydis Sato et al. 2013

Type strain
- JCM 17706, KCTC 23907, KS2-1

Species of bacterium

Bartonella acomydis is a Gram-negative, rod-shaped bacterium of the genus Bartonella. The species was first isolated from the blood of a wild-caught golden spiny mouse (Acomys russatus) that had been imported to Japan as an exotic pet from Egypt.

== Etymology ==
The species epithet acomydis derives from Acomys, the genus of spiny mice from which the type strain was isolated.

== Description ==
Like other members of the genus Bartonella, B. acomydis is a fastidious facultative intracellular bacterium that infects erythrocytes. The DNA G+C content of the type strain is 37.2 mol%.

== Taxonomy ==
Bartonella acomydis was formally described in 2013 by Sato and colleagues at Nihon University in Japan, alongside three other novel Bartonella species: B. jaculi, B. callosciuri, and B. pachyuromydis, all isolated from exotic rodents imported to Japan as pets. Phylogenetic analysis based on concatenated sequences of five loci (16S rRNA, ftsZ, gltA, rpoB genes and the ITS region) demonstrated that B. acomydis forms a distinct clade that can be differentiated from other known Bartonella species.

== Ecology ==
The natural host of B. acomydis is the golden spiny mouse (Acomys russatus), a rodent native to arid regions of the Middle East and Northeast Africa, including Egypt, Sinai, Israel, Jordan, and the Arabian Peninsula. Subsequent studies have detected B. acomydis in wild rodent populations in various countries within the WHO Eastern Mediterranean Region.

Bartonella species are typically transmitted between rodent hosts by blood-feeding arthropod vectors, particularly fleas. Rodents serve as natural reservoirs for many Bartonella species, maintaining persistent bacteremia that can last for months.
