= Bartonella rochalimae =

Scientific classification
- Domain: Bacteria
- Kingdom: Pseudomonadati
- Phylum: Pseudomonadota
- Class: Alphaproteobacteria
- Order: Hyphomicrobiales
- Family: Bartonellaceae
- Genus: Bartonella
- Species: B. rochalimae

Binomial name
- Bartonella rochalimae Eremeeva et al., 2007

Species of bacterium

Bartonella rochalimae is a strain of Gram-negative bacteria in the genus Bartonella, isolated by researchers at the University of California, San Francisco (UCSF), Massachusetts General Hospital, and the United States Centers for Disease Control and Prevention. The bacterium is a close relative of Bartonella quintana, the microbe which caused trench fever in thousands of soldiers during World War I. Named after Brazilian scientist Henrique da Rocha Lima, B. rochalimae is also closely related to Bartonella henselae, a bacterium identified in the mid-1990s during the AIDS epidemic in San Francisco as the cause of cat scratch fever, which still infects more than 24,000 people in the United States each year.

Scientists discovered the bacterium in a 43-year-old American woman who had traveled to Peru for three weeks. She developed possibly life-threatening anemia, an enlarged spleen, a 102 degree Fahrenheit (39 degree Celsius) fever, and insomnia two weeks after returning to the United States, symptoms akin to those of typhoid fever and malaria. The patient's sickness was first attributed to Bartonella bacilliformis, a known related species with a similar appearance under a microscope that is spread by sand flies and infects 10% of the human population in some regions of Peru with Oroya fever. Antibiotic treatment based on this diagnosis rapidly cured her infection, but further investigation proved the bacteria were of a formerly unknown species. It is possible that other cases diagnosed as Oroya fever result from this species. The findings were published in the New England Journal of Medicine on June 7, 2007.

In this same year, Bartonella rochalimae was also isolated from 3 dogs and 22 gray foxes in a rural area of Humboldt County along the Trinity River corridor near the town of Hoopa in northern California, US. The authors temporarily named the new organism as Bartonella clarridgeiae-like since it was closely related to B. clarridgeiae, and no official name was yet suggested. The discovery was performed at the Department of Population Health and Reproduction, School of Veterinary Medicine, University of California, Davis, and it was published in the Journal of Clinical Microbiology in 2007.

In March 2009, a report of a dog with endocarditis due to Bartonella rochalimae was published in the Journal of Clinical Microbiology. The 9-year-old male, neutered shepherd mix from San Francisco was referred to the University of California, Davis, in January 2000 due to lameness and obtunded mentation. Endocarditis was confirmed by echocardiography, and the dog died in August 2000. Analysis of the damaged aortic valve indicated that the dog was infected with a new Bartonella species, later confirmed to be Bartonella rochalimae by DNA analysis. According to the authors, this was the first time that B. rochalimae was identified in domestic and wild animals and the first report of B. rochalimae isolation from mammals in North America.

In May 2009, Bartonella rochalimae was also identified by DNA sequencing infecting a sick dog at the Veterinary Teaching Hospital of the Aristotle University of Thessaloniki. The discovery was made at the Vector Borne Diseases and Diagnostic Laboratory of the North Carolina State University, College of Veterinary Medicine, and was published in the Journal of Clinical Microbiology.

In July 2009, Bartonella rochalimae was also identified in fleas from cats and dogs from Chile. The organisms was detected by DNA amplification performed at the Special Pathogens Laboratory of the Área de Enfermedades Infecciosas of the Hospital San Pedro, La Rioja, Spain, and it was published in the Emerging Infectious Diseases journal.
