= Bartonella koehlerae =

Scientific classification
- Domain: Bacteria
- Kingdom: Pseudomonadati
- Phylum: Pseudomonadota
- Class: Alphaproteobacteria
- Order: Hyphomicrobiales
- Family: Bartonellaceae
- Genus: Bartonella
- Species: B. koehlerae

Binomial name
- Bartonella koehlerae Droz et al. 2000

Species of bacterium

Bartonella koehlerae is a bacterium first isolated from cats. Its genome consists of 1.7–1.8 Mb.

== See also ==
- Bartonella doshiae
- Bartonella grahamii
