= Bartonella elizabethae =

Scientific classification
- Domain: Bacteria
- Kingdom: Pseudomonadati
- Phylum: Pseudomonadota
- Class: Alphaproteobacteria
- Order: Hyphomicrobiales
- Family: Bartonellaceae
- Genus: Bartonella
- Species: B. elizabethae

Binomial name
- Bartonella elizabethae Daly et al., 1993

Species of bacterium

Bartonella elizabethae, formerly known as Rochalimaea elizabethae, is a bacterium in the genus Bartonella. Like other Bartonella species, it causes the diseases bartonellosis.

Although the illnesses caused by Bartonella species other than the most common human pathogens — B. bacilliformis, B. quintana, and B. henselae — are not well-characterized individually, severe forms of bartonellosis present with endocarditis, lymphadenopathy, and neuroretinitis. As with other Bartonella species, it can cause disease in animals, and the reservoirs of B. elizabethae include dogs and rats.

B. elizabethae, like other rodent-borne Bartonella species, represents an emerging public health threat, especially in urban areas where rats are endemic. Humans are an incidental host for the pathogen — direct transmission from dogs to humans is not well attested, and most human cases are contracted from ticks serving as a vector. In cities, marginalized populations face greater risks: a 1992 study of the prevalence of bloodborne pathogens among homeless intravenous drug users in Los Angeles found an overall prevalence of 12.5% in this population.
