= Bartonella doshiae =

Scientific classification
- Domain: Bacteria
- Kingdom: Pseudomonadati
- Phylum: Pseudomonadota
- Class: Alphaproteobacteria
- Order: Hyphomicrobiales
- Family: Bartonellaceae
- Genus: Bartonella
- Species: B. doshiae

Binomial name
- Bartonella doshiae Birtles et al. 1995

Species of bacterium

Bartonella doshiae is a bacterium. As with other Bartonella species, it can cause disease in animals.

== See also ==
- Bartonella grahamii
- Bartonella peromysci
- Bartonella talpae
- Bartonella taylorii
