= Bartonella apis =

Scientific classification
- Domain: Bacteria
- Kingdom: Pseudomonadati
- Phylum: Pseudomonadota
- Class: Alphaproteobacteria
- Order: Hyphomicrobiales
- Family: Bartonellaceae
- Genus: Bartonella
- Species: B. apis

Binomial name
- Bartonella apis Kešnerová et al. 2016

Type strain
- DSM 29779, NCIMB 14961, BBC0104, BBC0108, PEB0122, PEB0149, PEB0150

Species of bacterium

Bartonella apis is a bacterium from the genus Bartonella. Bartonella apis was first isolated from the gut of the honey bee (Apis mellifera) in 2015 by Swiss researchers at the University of Lausanne. To date, it has been found only as a gut symbiont of honey bees, including the Western honey bee (Apis mellifera), and the Eastern or Asiatic honey bee (Apis cerana).

== Phylogeny and characteristics ==
Bartonella apis is a member of the order Rhizobiales and class Alphaproteobacteria. Phylogenetically, it places in the genus Bartonella through 16s rRNA genetic homology, with its nearest relative being Bartonella tamiae, a human pathogen isolated initially from three patients in Thailand and an uncultured Bartonella species isolated from an ant. Like other Bartonellae, B. apis is a small (1.2 to 1.8 um), gram negative rod shaped organism. Transmission electron microscopy revealed hair like structures on the cellular envelope as well as suspected flagellae, which are also seen in other Bartonella species. Other commonly known Bartonellae include human pathogens, such as the facultatively intracellular Bartonella henselae, causative agent of cat scratch disease; Bartonella quintana, causative agent of "trench fever"; and Bartonella bacilliformis, causative agent of carrion's disease. Pathogenic Bartonellae are transmitted by biting arthropod vector, which in combination with genetic evidence, leads researchers to hypothesize that these strains evolved from insect gut symbionts.

== Bee gut microbiome ==
Bartonella apis is less numerous than other members of the honey bee gut microbiota, however it is still considered to be among the dominant set of nine species most commonly found in the bee gut. Some studies have shown that it may not always be present in every member of a hive at all times, and that there can be changes in its population level depending on season and forage type. Papp et al showed that B. apis abundance increased between the beginning of the honey producing period and the peak of this period, but that it also decreased in warmer temperatures, whereas Li et al found that abundance of B. apis in the gut increased with winter forage. Like the bacteriome of other species, the gut bacteria of the honey bee are thought to respond to changes in diet as well as other environmental factors which are still under investigation.

Metagenomic studies have helped to elucidate the potential functions provided for the honey bee as a gut symbiont, and this bacterium appears to provide several key nutritional benefits. Aside from possessing genes responsible for degrading secondary plant metabolites in pollen and nectar, B. apis possesses complete enzymatic pathways necessary for both the citric acid cycle and for glycolysis, along with vitamin B biosynthesis genes. Additionally, it is capable of biosynthesizing several amino acids as well as purines and pyrimidines utilizing compounds including quinic acid and orotate. B. apis is also able to ferment carbohydrates under microaerophilic conditions, as well as play a role in nitrogenous waste recycling; important functions of gut symbionts seen in other insect species.

== Effect of antimicrobials ==
Given the global importance of honey bee pollination for sustaining both agricultural and wild plant species and the susceptibility of this social insect to colony collapse, researchers are studying the role of the bee gut microbiome in honey bee health and productivity. Commonly utilized antimicrobials can create significant shifts in bee microbiotal species diversity and abundance, and may also drive antimicrobial resistance.

Significant decreases in abundance of B. apis was noted in the gut microbiome in response to oxytetracycline and sulfonamides, whereas treatment with tylosin was related to an increased abundance in the gut microbiome, possibly related to this latter drug having more effect against gram positive organisms. In addition, exposure to tetracycline during bee larval development negatively impacted nutrition metabolism, immunity and developmental rate related to decreases in microbiotal species, overall linking microbiotal functions to insect fitness.
