= Bartonella japonica =

Scientific classification
- Domain: Bacteria
- Kingdom: Pseudomonadati
- Phylum: Pseudomonadota
- Class: Alphaproteobacteria
- Order: Hyphomicrobiales
- Family: Bartonellaceae
- Genus: Bartonella
- Species: B. japonica

Binomial name
- Bartonella japonica Inoue et al. 2010

Species of bacterium

Bartonella japonica is a species of bacteria in the genus Bartonella. A strain of this species was originally isolated from the blood of a small Japanese field mouse (Apodemus argenteus).

== See also ==
- Bartonella silvatica, a related species isolated from the large Japanese field mouse (Apodemus speciosus).
