= Capreoli =

Capreoli may refer to:

- Bartonella capreoli, species of bacteria
- Lipoptena capreoli, species of fly
