= Bartonella australis =

Scientific classification
- Domain: Bacteria
- Kingdom: Pseudomonadati
- Phylum: Pseudomonadota
- Class: Alphaproteobacteria
- Order: Hyphomicrobiales
- Family: Bartonellaceae
- Genus: Bartonella
- Species: B. australis

Binomial name
- Bartonella australis Fournier et al. 2007

Species of bacterium

Bartonella australis is a Gram-negative bacterium of the genus Bartonella which was isolated from eastern grey kangaroos (Macropus giganteus).
