= Bartonella heixiaziensis =

Scientific classification
- Domain: Bacteria
- Kingdom: Pseudomonadati
- Phylum: Pseudomonadota
- Class: Alphaproteobacteria
- Order: Hyphomicrobiales
- Family: Bartonellaceae
- Genus: Bartonella
- Species: B. heixiaziensis

Binomial name
- Bartonella heixiaziensis Li et al. 2016

Type strain
- CR90HXZ, CGMCC 1.15048, DSM 100695

Species of bacterium

Bartonella heixiaziensis is a bacterium from the genus Bartonella.
