= Bartonella ancashensis =

Scientific classification
- Domain: Bacteria
- Kingdom: Pseudomonadati
- Phylum: Pseudomonadota
- Class: Alphaproteobacteria
- Order: Hyphomicrobiales
- Family: Bartonellaceae
- Genus: Bartonella
- Species: B. ancashensis

Binomial name
- Bartonella ancashensis Mullins et al. 2015

Type strain
- ATCC BAA-2694, DSM 29364, strain 20.00

Synonyms
- Candidatus Bartonella ancashi,

Species of bacterium

Bartonella ancashensis is a bacterium from the genus Bartonella which has been isolated from blood from patients who suffered from verruga peruana in Caraz in Peru. Bartonella ancashensis is a human pathogen which may cause verruga peruana.

It is not yet certain if Bartonella ancashensis causes verruga peruana, as it may not meet all of Koch's postulates. Still, there is not experimental reproduction of Peruvian wart in animals for affirm that bartonella ancashi causes the Peruvian wart. Science needs to base its conclusions on the best available evidence.
