= Bartonella coopersplainsensis =

Scientific classification
- Domain: Bacteria
- Kingdom: Pseudomonadati
- Phylum: Pseudomonadota
- Class: Alphaproteobacteria
- Order: Hyphomicrobiales
- Family: Bartonellaceae
- Genus: Bartonella
- Species: B. coopersplainsensis

Binomial name
- Bartonella coopersplainsensis Gundi et al. 2009

Synonyms
- Bartonella coopersplainensis

Species of bacterium

Bartonella coopersplainsensis is a Gram-negative, non-motile bacteria from the genus Bartonella which was isolated from the blood of a wild rat (Rattus leucopus).
