= Bartonella antechini =

"Candidatus Bartonella antechini"

Scientific classification (Candidatus)
- Domain: Bacteria
- Kingdom: Pseudomonadati
- Phylum: Pseudomonadota
- Class: Alphaproteobacteria
- Order: Hyphomicrobiales
- Family: Bartonellaceae
- Genus: Bartonella
- Species: "Ca. B. antechini"

Binomial name
- "Candidatus Bartonella antechini" Kaewmangkol et al. 2011

Species of bacterium

"Candidatus Bartonella antechini" is a candidatus bacteria from the genus Bartonella which was isolated from the mouse Antechinus flavipes.
