= Bartonella rattaustraliani =

Scientific classification
- Domain: Bacteria
- Kingdom: Pseudomonadati
- Phylum: Pseudomonadota
- Class: Alphaproteobacteria
- Order: Hyphomicrobiales
- Family: Bartonellaceae
- Genus: Bartonella
- Species: B. rattaustraliani

Binomial name
- Bartonella rattaustraliani Gundi et al. 2009

Type strain
- Bartonella rattiaustraliensis

Species of bacterium

Bartonella rattaustraliani is a bacterium from the genus Bartonella which was isolated from the blood of rats from the genus of Melomys.
