= Bartonella alsatica =

Scientific classification
- Domain: Bacteria
- Kingdom: Pseudomonadati
- Phylum: Pseudomonadota
- Class: Alphaproteobacteria
- Order: Hyphomicrobiales
- Family: Bartonellaceae
- Genus: Bartonella
- Species: B. alsatica

Binomial name
- Bartonella alsatica Heller et al., 1999

Species of bacterium

Bartonella alsatica is a bacterium. Like other Bartonella species, it can cause disease in animals. It is small, aerobic, oxidase-negative, and Gram-negative. Its rod-like cells were localized within wild rabbit erythrocytes when first described. The type strain is IBS 382^{T} (= CIP 105477^{T}). It is associated with cases of lymphadenitis and endocarditis.
