= Bartonella vinsonii =

Scientific classification
- Domain: Bacteria
- Kingdom: Pseudomonadati
- Phylum: Pseudomonadota
- Class: Alphaproteobacteria
- Order: Hyphomicrobiales
- Family: Bartonellaceae
- Genus: Bartonella
- Species: B. vinsonii

Binomial name
- Bartonella vinsonii Brenner et al. 1993

Type strain
- ATCC 152-VR, CCUG 30453, CDC G6130, CIP 103738, strain Baker, VR 152

Synonyms
- Rochalimaea vinsonii

Species of bacterium

Bartonella vinsonii is a gram-negative bacteria from the genus Bartonella which was isolated from dogs. Rochalimaea vinsonii was reclassified to Bartonella vinsonii. B. vinsonii contains three validly published subspecies B. vinsonii subsp. arupensis, B. vinsonii subsp. berkhoffii, and B. vinsonii subsp. vinsonii, and one effectively published B. vinsonii subsp. yucatanensis. B. vinsonii subsp. vinsonii has been isolated from voles and B. vinsonii subsp. berkhofli was isolated from a dog with endocarditis. B. vinsonii subsp. berkhoffii can cause diseases in humans. Those two subspecies are named after J. William Vinson and Herman A. Berkhoff.
