= Bartonella mayotimonensis =

"Candidatus Bartonella mayotimonensis"

Scientific classification (Candidatus)
- Domain: Bacteria
- Kingdom: Pseudomonadati
- Phylum: Pseudomonadota
- Class: Alphaproteobacteria
- Order: Hyphomicrobiales
- Family: Bartonellaceae
- Genus: Bartonella
- Species: "Ca. B. mayotimonensis"

Binomial name
- "Candidatus Bartonella mayotimonensis" Lin et al. 2010

Species of bacterium

"Candidatus Bartonella mayotimonensis" is a candidatus bacteria from the genus Bartonella which can cause endocarditis in humans. Ca. B. mayotimonensis was first isolated from a sample taken from the aortic valve of a human patient from Iowa in 2008. The bacteria is present in the microbiomes of bat species worldwide. As with other Bartonella species, Ca. B. mayotimonensis can be transmitted by hematophagous ectoparasites such as fleas.

== Etiology ==
Ca. Bartonella mayotimonensis is a rod-shaped, gram-negative aerobic bacteria which infects the cardiovascular system. It is primarily found within bats and can be transmitted to humans by arthropod vectors, but direct bat-to-human transmission has not yet been proven possible. It is transmitted by bat flies, fleas, mites, and other ectoparasites. After feeding on an infected bat, ectoparasites may transmit the disease to new hosts through the deposition of fecal matter into superficial wounds caused during feeding. Increased genetic diversity in the strains isolated from Chinese bat flies suggests that Ca. B. mayotimonensis may undergo vertical transmission among arthropod vectors, which would allow ectoparasites to spread the disease without ever encountering an animal host. Phylogenetic analysis of bat ectoparasite microbiomes indicates a genetically distinct cluster of Ca. B. mayotimonensis in the Northern Hemisphere.

== Symptoms ==
Humans infected with Ca. B. mayotimonensis can experience hemotrophic bacteremia resulting in symptoms such as fever, chills, and hypotension of varying severity for months or years, often resulting in endocarditis. Bartonella endocarditis can cause shortness of breath, fatigue, rapid weight loss, altered mental status, heart murmur, blood flowing backwards within the heart, and cardiac arrest. Left untreated, the disease results in fatal heart failure. Endocarditis resulting from Bartonella infection requires surgery in 76% of cases. Because Bartonella species are gram-negative and are not detected by bacterial or fungal culturing methods, patients may not be diagnosed until the disease progression results in a cardiac event. Bartonella endocarditis is caused by the formation of bacterial biofilms and vegetative masses within the arteries and valves of the heart. These masses are more tolerant of antimicrobials and immune system responses than free-floating bacterial cells, often requiring surgical removal. Groups with an increased risk of developing Bartonella endocarditis include those with preexisting cardiovascular conditions, liver disease, kidney disease, and the elderly. Those with an increased risk of exposure to bloodfeeding parasites (such as people with frequent exposure to wild animals and people with a history of homelessness) and people with autoimmune disorders, HIV, or other immunocompromising conditions are also at an increased risk of infection and severe illness. As with other Bartonella species, agricultural workers and those living in rural areas are also at an elevated risk of infection due to increased exposure to fleas, ticks, and other parasites common among livestock.

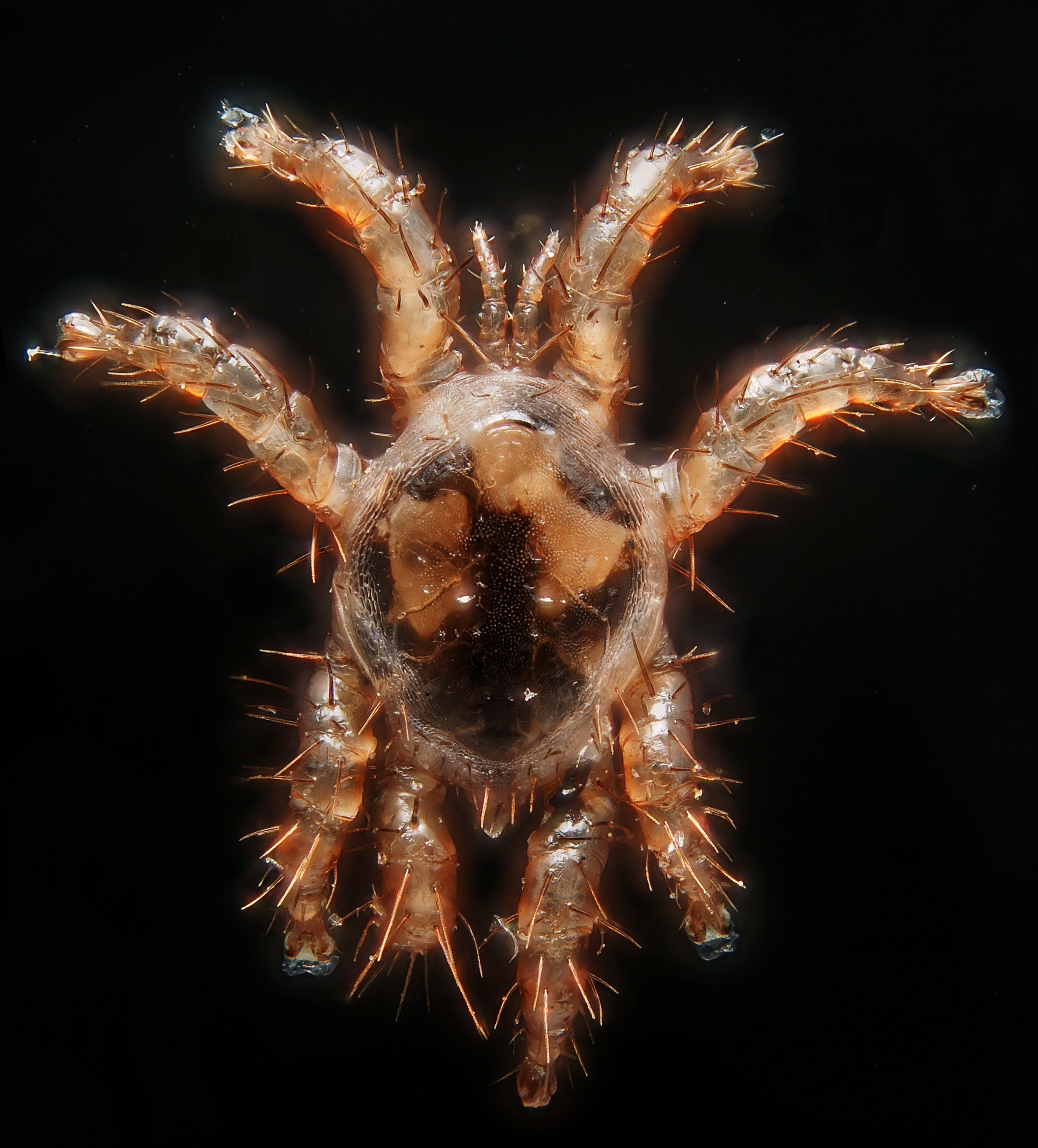
A mite in the family Spinturnicidae, one of the most prevalent ectoparasites found on bats

== Diagnosis and treatment ==
Due to difficulties detecting Bartonella species using conventional methods such as gram staining, bacterial culture, and fungal culture, most diagnoses are made using PCR testing once more common causes of endocarditis have been ruled out. Infection can also be detected using an immunofluorescence assay or a Western blot assay. Treatment with antibiotics may be used to control the infection, usually in conjunction with surgical intervention to remove vegetative masses and repair damaged valves.

== Impacts on wildlife ==
Bartonella reservoir species are relatively unaffected by their infections and likely co-evolved with their respective pathogen. Bats, which are the primary vector of Ca. B. mayotimonensis, are known to possess a robust immune system uniquely adapted to handle high viral loads and to manage disease while decreasing inflammation within the body. This may protect them against endocarditis, which is characterized by the inflammation of the heart's inner lining. They are also likely protected by cardiovascular adaptations associated with their flight abilities and tendency to rest upside down, such as a thin blood–gas barrier, large pulmonary capillary blood volume, large alveolar surface area, and high venous haematocrit and haemoglobin concentrations. These adaptations allow their cardiovascular systems to endure the strain of flight and prolonged inversion. Ca. B. mayotimonensis bacteria are most commonly found in blood-feeding bats and those with a high ectoparasite burden. This is likely due in part to increased risk of exposure from feeding on infected prey animals.

== Future research ==
No management strategies are currently in place to specifically address Ca. Bartonella mayotimonensis, though the risk of transmission to humans may be impacted by existing protocols aimed at preventing the spread of other bat diseases such as white nose syndrome. As a recently discovered disease with few confirmed human cases, many details around Ca. B. mayotimonensis remains unknown. Future research could investigate the possibility of transmission between blood-feeding vampire bats and their prey, as well as the possible interactions between Ca. B. mayotimonensis and common prey species such as cattle, tapir, horses, and birds. If livestock animals can become infected and serve as reservoirs, greater potential for transmission to humans may result. Further investigation is also warranted to confirm the potential vertical transmission observed in Chinese bat flies, another risk factor for zoonotic potential. Future study may also seek to explore the genetic differences between the previously-identified Northern Hemisphere cluster and strains detected in the Southern Hemisphere. Further investigation into disease progression in humans may be useful in determining methods for earlier diagnosis prior to major cardiac events requiring surgical intervention. Greater research into the distribution of Ca. B. mayotimonensis and other individual species within the Bartonella genus is required to better understand its zoonotic potential, as well as the threat posed by the genus as a whole.
