= Bartonella tamiae =

Scientific classification
- Domain: Bacteria
- Kingdom: Pseudomonadati
- Phylum: Pseudomonadota
- Class: Alphaproteobacteria
- Order: Hyphomicrobiales
- Family: Bartonellaceae
- Genus: Bartonella
- Species: B. tamiae

Binomial name
- Bartonella tamiae Kosoy et al. 2008

Type strain
- Th239, Th307, Th339

Species of bacterium

Bartonella tamiae is a Gram-negative, rod-shaped bacteria from the genus Bartonella which was isolated from the blood of patients in Thailand. Bartonella tamiae can cause illness in humans.
