= Bartonella bandicootii =

"Candidatus Bartonella bandicootii"

Scientific classification (Candidatus)
- Domain: Bacteria
- Kingdom: Pseudomonadati
- Phylum: Pseudomonadota
- Class: Alphaproteobacteria
- Order: Hyphomicrobiales
- Family: Bartonellaceae
- Genus: Bartonella
- Species: "Ca. B. bandicootii"

Binomial name
- "Candidatus Bartonella bandicootii" Kaewmongkol et al. 2011

Species of bacterium

"Candidatus Bartonella bandicootii" is a candidatus bacteria from the genus Bartonella which was isolated from fleas (Pygiopsylla tunneyi).
