= Bartonella bovis =

Scientific classification
- Domain: Bacteria
- Kingdom: Pseudomonadati
- Phylum: Pseudomonadota
- Class: Alphaproteobacteria
- Order: Hyphomicrobiales
- Family: Bartonellaceae
- Genus: Bartonella
- Species: B. bovis

Binomial name
- Bartonella bovis Bermond et al. 2002

Synonyms
- "Bartonella weissii" Regnery et al. 2000

Species of bacterium

Bartonella bovis is a pathogenic bacteria first isolated from European ruminants. It is small, fastidious, aerobic, oxidase-negative, gram-negative and rod-shaped. Its type strain is 91-4^{T} (= CIP 106692^{T} = CCUG 43828^{T}).
