= Bartonella gabonensis =

Scientific classification
- Domain: Bacteria
- Kingdom: Pseudomonadati
- Phylum: Pseudomonadota
- Class: Alphaproteobacteria
- Order: Hyphomicrobiales
- Family: Bartonellaceae
- Genus: Bartonella
- Species: B. gabonensis

Binomial name
- Bartonella gabonensis Mangombi et al. 2020

Type strain
- 669

Species of bacteria

Bartonella gabonensis is a bacterium from the genus Bartonella which has been isolated from the mouse Lophuromys sp. which was living in Franceville.

== Genome ==
Scientists did whole genome sequence on the bacteria. They sequenced 100% genome of this new species. Genome of Bartonella gabonensis contained 1,971,183 bp with 47% G+C content. They also sequenced 17s RNA and other important genes. All genetic data of this bacteria was discovered by scientists.

== Discovery ==
The team who discovered it consisted of J. B. Mangombi, N. N'Dilimabaka, H. Medkour, L. Banga, M. L. Tall, M. Ben Khedher, J. Terras, S. Abdi, M. Bourgarel, E. Leroy, F. Fenollar and O. Mediannikov.
