= Bartonella melophagi =

"Candidatus Bartonella melophagi"

Scientific classification (Candidatus)
- Domain: Bacteria
- Kingdom: Pseudomonadati
- Phylum: Pseudomonadota
- Class: Alphaproteobacteria
- Order: Hyphomicrobiales
- Family: Bartonellaceae
- Genus: Bartonella
- Species: "Ca. B. melophagi"

Binomial name
- "Candidatus Bartonella melophagi" Maggi et al. 2009

Species of bacterium

"Candidatus Bartonella melophagi" is a candidatus species of Bartonella that causes infection in humans.
