= Bartonella woyliei =

"Candidatus Bartonella woyliei"

Scientific classification (Candidatus)
- Domain: Bacteria
- Kingdom: Pseudomonadati
- Phylum: Pseudomonadota
- Class: Alphaproteobacteria
- Order: Hyphomicrobiales
- Family: Bartonellaceae
- Genus: Bartonella
- Species: "Ca. B. woyliei"

Binomial name
- "Candidatus Bartonella woyliei" Kaewmongkol et al. 2011

Species of bacterium

"Candidatus Bartonella woyliei" is a candidatus bacteria from the genus Bartonella which was isolated from the flea Pygiopsylla hilli and the tick Ixodes australiensis.
