= Bartonella phoceensis =

Scientific classification
- Domain: Bacteria
- Kingdom: Pseudomonadati
- Phylum: Pseudomonadota
- Class: Alphaproteobacteria
- Order: Hyphomicrobiales
- Family: Bartonellaceae
- Genus: Bartonella
- Species: B. phoceensis

Binomial name
- Bartonella phoceensis Gundi et al. 2004

Species of bacterium

Bartonella phoceensis is a bacterium from the genus Bartonella which was isolated from the blood of the rat Rattus norvegicus.
