= Bartonella silvicola =

Scientific classification
- Domain: Bacteria
- Kingdom: Pseudomonadati
- Phylum: Pseudomonadota
- Class: Alphaproteobacteria
- Order: Hyphomicrobiales
- Family: Bartonellaceae
- Genus: Bartonella
- Species: B. silvicola

Binomial name
- Bartonella silvicola

Species of bacterium

Bartonella silvicola is a bacterium from the genus Bartonella.
