= Bartonella chomelii =

Scientific classification
- Domain: Bacteria
- Kingdom: Pseudomonadati
- Phylum: Pseudomonadota
- Class: Alphaproteobacteria
- Order: Hyphomicrobiales
- Family: Bartonellaceae
- Genus: Bartonella
- Species: B. chomelii

Binomial name
- Bartonella chomelii Maillard et al. 2004

Species of bacterium

Bartonella chomelii is a Gram-negative, oxidase- and catalase-negative bacteria from the genus Bartonella with a unipolar flagellum which was isolated from a domestic cattle (Bos taurus). Bartonella chomelii is named after Bruno B. Chomel.
