= Bartonella mastomysi =

"Candidatus Bartonella mastomydis"

Scientific classification (Candidatus)
- Domain: Bacteria
- Kingdom: Pseudomonadati
- Phylum: Pseudomonadota
- Class: Alphaproteobacteria
- Order: Hyphomicrobiales
- Family: Bartonellaceae
- Genus: Bartonella
- Species: "Ca. B. mastomysi"

Binomial name
- "Candidatus Bartonella mastomydis" corrig. Mediannikov et al. 2014

Type strain
- 008; CSUR B643; DSM 2802

Synonyms
- "Candidatus Bartonella mastomydis" Mediannikov et al. 2014; "Bartonella mastomydis" Dahmani et al. 2018

Species of bacterium

"Candidatus Bartonella mastomysi" is a bacterium from the genus Bartonella which has been isolated from the Guinea multimammate mouse from Sine-Saloum in Senegal.
