= Bartonella schoenbuchensis =

Scientific classification
- Domain: Bacteria
- Kingdom: Pseudomonadati
- Phylum: Pseudomonadota
- Class: Alphaproteobacteria
- Order: Hyphomicrobiales
- Family: Bartonellaceae
- Genus: Bartonella
- Species: B. schoenbuchensis

Binomial name
- Bartonella schoenbuchensis corrig. Dehio et al. 2001

Type strain
- CCUG 50783, CIP 107819, DSM 13525, E251, NCTC 13165, R-1

Synonyms
- Bartonella schoenbuchii

Species of bacterium

Bartonella schoenbuchensis is a bacterium from the genus Bartonella which was isolated from the fly Lipoptena cervi, also known as the deer ked. Bartonella schoenbuchensis from deer ked can cause dermatitis in humans.
