= Bartonella birtlesii =

Scientific classification
- Domain: Bacteria
- Kingdom: Pseudomonadati
- Phylum: Pseudomonadota
- Class: Alphaproteobacteria
- Order: Hyphomicrobiales
- Family: Bartonellaceae
- Genus: Bartonella
- Species: B. birtlesii

Binomial name
- Bartonella birtlesii Bermond et al. 2000

Species of bacterium

Bartonella birtlesii is an oxidase- and catalase-negative bacteria from the genus Bartonella which was isolated from Apodemus.
