= Bartonella thailandensis =

"Candidatus Bartonella thailandensis"

Scientific classification (Candidatus)
- Domain: Bacteria
- Kingdom: Pseudomonadati
- Phylum: Pseudomonadota
- Class: Alphaproteobacteria
- Order: Hyphomicrobiales
- Family: Bartonellaceae
- Genus: Bartonella
- Species: "Ca. B. thailandensis"

Binomial name
- "Candidatus Bartonella thailandensis" Saisongkorh et al. 2009

Species of bacterium

"Candidatus Bartonella thailandensis" is a candidatus bacteria from the genus Bartonella which was isolated in Thailand.
