= Bartonella queenslandensis =

Scientific classification
- Domain: Bacteria
- Kingdom: Pseudomonadati
- Phylum: Pseudomonadota
- Class: Alphaproteobacteria
- Order: Hyphomicrobiales
- Family: Bartonellaceae
- Genus: Bartonella
- Species: B. queenslandensis

Binomial name
- Bartonella queenslandensis Gundi et al. 2009

Type strain
- AUST/NH12, CCUG 52167, CIP 109057, CSUR B617

Species of bacterium

Bartonella queenslandensis is a Gram-negative bacteria from the genus Bartonella which was isolated from the blood of rats from the genus of Melomys in Queensland in Australia.
