= Bartonella washoensis =

Scientific classification
- Domain: Bacteria
- Kingdom: Pseudomonadati
- Phylum: Pseudomonadota
- Class: Alphaproteobacteria
- Order: Hyphomicrobiales
- Family: Bartonellaceae
- Genus: Bartonella
- Species: B. washoensi

Binomial name
- Bartonella washoensi Breitschwerdt and Kordick 2000

Species of bacterium

Bartonella washoensis is a bacterium from the genus Bartonella which was first isolated from a dog with mitral valve endocarditis. Bartonella washoensis can infect squirrels but also can cause meningitis in humans.
