= Bartonella breitschwerdtii =

"Candidatus Bartonella breitschwerdtii"

Scientific classification (Candidatus)
- Domain: Bacteria
- Kingdom: Pseudomonadati
- Phylum: Pseudomonadota
- Class: Alphaproteobacteria
- Order: Hyphomicrobiales
- Family: Bartonellaceae
- Genus: Bartonella
- Species: "Ca. B. breitschwerdtii"

Binomial name
- "Candidatus Bartonella breitschwerdtii"

Species of bacterium

"Candidatus Bartonella breitschwerdtii" is a candidatus bacteria from the genus Bartonella.
