= Bartonella senegalensis =

Scientific classification
- Domain: Bacteria
- Kingdom: Pseudomonadati
- Phylum: Pseudomonadota
- Class: Alphaproteobacteria
- Order: Hyphomicrobiales
- Family: Bartonellaceae
- Genus: Bartonella
- Species: B. senegalensis

Binomial name
- Bartonella senegalensis Mediannikov et al. 2014

Type strain
- CSUR B623, DSM 23168, strain OS02

Species of bacterium

Bartonella senegalensis is a Gram-negative, aerobic, rod-shaped, catalase- and oxidase-negative non-spore-forming, non-motile bacteria from the genus Bartonella which was isolated from the tick Ornithodoros sonrai in Senegal in Africa.
