= Bartonella fuyuanensis =

Scientific classification
- Domain: Bacteria
- Kingdom: Pseudomonadati
- Phylum: Pseudomonadota
- Class: Alphaproteobacteria
- Order: Hyphomicrobiales
- Family: Bartonellaceae
- Genus: Bartonella
- Species: B. fuyuanensis

Binomial name
- Bartonella fuyuanensis Li et al. 2016

Type strain
- CGMCC 1.15047, DSM 100694, AA137HXZ

Species of bacterium

Bartonella fuyuanensis is a species of gram-negative bacteria from the genus Bartonella.
