= Bartonella sahelensis =

"Candidatus Bartonella sahelensis"

Scientific classification (Candidatus)
- Domain: Bacteria
- Kingdom: Pseudomonadati
- Phylum: Pseudomonadota
- Class: Alphaproteobacteria
- Order: Hyphomicrobiales
- Family: Bartonellaceae
- Genus: Bartonella
- Species: "Ca. B. sahelensis"

Binomial name
- "Candidatus Bartonella sahelensis" corrig. Mediannikov et al. 2014

Type strain
- 077; CSUR B644T; DSM 28003T

Synonyms
- "Candidatus Bartonella saheliensis" Mediannikov et al. 2014; "Bartonella saheliensis" Dahmana et al. 2020

Species of bacterium

"Candidatus Bartonella sahelensis" is a Gram-negative bacterium from the genus Bartonella which has been isolated from the blood of a Kemp's gerbil from Sine-Saloum in Senegal.

== Discovery ==
It was discovered by team of scientists consisting H. Dahmana, H. Medkour, H. Anani, L. Granjon, G. Diatta, F. Fenollar, and O. Mediannikov. The team isolated it, from the blood of a Kemp's gerbil from Sine-Saloum in Senegal. Then they sequenced its full genome and identified their morphological structure and announced their discovery.

== Genome ==
Its genome has 2,327,299 bp (G+C content 38.4%) and codes for 2015 proteins and 53 RNA genes. Its 16sRNA and other components of gene were sequenced and submitted to the gene bank.
