= Bartonella florencae =

Scientific classification
- Domain: Bacteria
- Kingdom: Pseudomonadati
- Phylum: Pseudomonadota
- Class: Alphaproteobacteria
- Order: Hyphomicrobiales
- Family: Bartonellaceae
- Genus: Bartonella
- Species: B. florencae

Binomial name
- Bartonella florencae Mediannikov et al. 2014

Type strain
- CSUR B627, DSM 23735, R-4

Synonyms
- Bartonella florenciae

Species of bacterium

Bartonella florencae is a bacterium from the genus of Bartonella which has been isolated from a dead shrew (Crocidura russula) from Calanque d'En-Vau in France.
