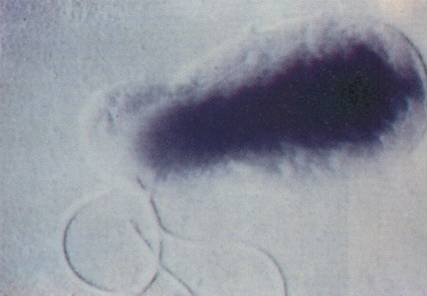

Scientific classification
- Domain: Bacteria
- Kingdom: Pseudomonadati
- Phylum: Pseudomonadota
- Class: Alphaproteobacteria
- Order: Hyphomicrobiales
- Family: Bartonellaceae; Gieszczykiewicz 1939 (Approved Lists 1980)
- Genus: Bartonella; Strong et al. 1915 (Approved Lists 1980)

Species
- B. acomydis; B. alsatica; B. ancashensis; "Candidatus B. antechini"; B. apis; B. australis; B. bacilliformis; "Candidatus B. bandicootii"; B. birtlesii; B. bovis; "Candidatus B. breitschwerdtii"; B. callosciuri; B. capreoli; B. chomelii; B. clarridgeiae; B. coopersplainsensis; B. doshiae; "Candidatus B. durdenii"; "Candidatus B. eldjazairii"; B. elizabethae; B. florencae; B. fuyuanensis; B. gabonensis; B. grahamii; B. heixiaziensis; B. henselae; B. jaculi; B. japonica; B. koehlerae; B. kosoyi; B. krasnovii; "Candidatus B. mastomysi"; "Candidatus B. mayotimonensis"; "Candidatus B. melophagi"; "Candidatus B. merieuxii"; "Candidatus B. monaxi"; B. naantaliensis; "Candidatus B. ovis"; B. pachyuromydis; B. peromysci; B. phoceensis; B. queenslandensis; B. quintana; B. rattaustraliani; B. rattimassiliensis; B. rochalimae; "Candidatus B. rudakovii"; "Candidatus B. sahelensis"; B. schoenbuchensis; B. senegalensis; B. silvatica; B. silvicola; B. talpae; B. tamiae; B. taylorii; "Candidatus B. thailandensis"; B. tribocorum; B. vinsonii; "Candidatus B. volans"; B. washoensis; "Candidatus B. woyliei"

Synonyms
- Bartonia Strong et al. 1913; Grahamella (ex Brumpt 1911) Ristic and Kreier 1984; Rochalimaea (Macchiavello 1947) Krieg 1961

= Bartonella =

Genus of bacteria

Bartonella is a genus of Gram-negative bacteria. It is the only genus in the family Bartonellaceae. Bartonella species cause bartonellosis, which is a group of zoonotic infectious diseases that affects both humans and animals. Common forms include cat-scratch disease (Bartonella henselae) and trench fever (Bartonella quintana). As Facultative intracellular parasites, Bartonella species can infect healthy people, but are considered especially important as opportunistic pathogens. Bartonella species are transmitted by vectors such as fleas, sand flies, ticks and mosquitoes.

Currently, 12 Bartonella species are known to infect humans. As research continues, more species transmissible to humans from vectors can be discovered. 37 different species and 3 subspecies of Bartonella exist. While 12 species can infect humans, 3 Bartonella pathogens are largely associated with human transmission and infection: B. henselae, B. quintana, and Bartonella bacilliformis.

== Bartonella henselae ==
Bartonella henselae is the most common Bartonella bacterium that causes infection and is commonly referred to as "cat-scratch disease." Historically, the B. henselae bacterial infection was thought to have been transmitted through an infected cat's scratch or bite. However, recent research suggests that vectors such as ticks, chiggers, and mosquitoes can also infect humans with B. henselae. Fleas from infected cats can also transmit the bacteria to humans.

== Bartonella quintana ==
Bartonella quintana is also a common Bartonella pathogen that infects humans, often referred to as "trench fever." B. quintana primarily spreads through body louse. This bacterium is known to only infect humans. While B. henselae is the most common Bartonella bacteria, B. quintana still sees new cases of the infection every year globally.

== Bartonella bacilliformis ==
Bartonella bacilliformis is a bacteria that humans can contract various Bartonella infections from. Specific parts of South America have vectors that can transmit this infection, such as Peru and the Andes Mountains. This bacterium is spread through the bite of sandflies that have B. bacilliformis. However, research about the cycle of this disease is unknown. This bacterium is responsible for acute and chronic Bartonella, also referred to as Carrion's disease, and can cause serious health complications.

== History ==
Bartonella species have been infecting humans for thousands of years, as demonstrated by Bartonella quintana DNA being found in a 4000-year-old tooth. The genus is named for Alberto Leonardo Barton Thompson (1871 – October 26, 1950), an Argentine-born Peruvian scientist.

The numerous Bartonella species have different origins. For many Bartonella species discoveries, dental pulp was the body source where the bacteria was found. Bartonella henselae, B. quintana, and Bartonella tribocorum are just some of the species discovered through dental pulp. While the discoveries of the various bacteria are different, B. henselae, B. quintana, and Bartonella bacilliformis have the most researched origins.

=== Bartonella henselae ===
The B. henselae pathogen was discovered in 1990 by researchers through biological experiments involving skin lesions. It was initially named Rochalimaea henselae after its discovery, but was then classified as a Bartonella species in 1993 and then renamed B. henselae.

Years later in 2004, researchers found B. henselae in dental pulp in remains of cats spanning from the 13th, 14th, and 16th centuries in European burial sites. Researchers then tested the remains using gene analyses, discovering that animals could be a reservoir for the pathogen.

=== Bartonella quintana ===
Bartonella. quintana has been found in individuals dating back to 2230 and 1950 BC through radiocarbon testing.

During a search for lice-transmitted bacteria, remains of soldiers from Napoleon's Grand Army were tested using gene testing, and other methods discovered B. quintana in body lice fragments and soldiers' teeth. In 1981, a grave from the 18th century in France had young male corpses that were thought to be soldiers. Out of the 23 individuals, 55 teeth tested positive for B. quintana.

In 2001, soldiers' remains–from Napoleon's Grand Army–in a Lithuanian grave were discovered and used for lice-transmitted pathogen testing. The testing discovered B. quintana in body lice fragments and in tooth pulp. In 2004, the earliest presence of B. quintana was found in a buried individual's dental pulp from approximately 4000 years ago. This discovery also marked the oldest evidence of infection from a zoonotic pathogen.

Over the span of 4,000 years, other discoveries of B. quintana were found in multiple different human remains. In 2007, burial sites from the Middle Ages in France had human skeletons that contained B. quintana in their dental pulp. Additionally, through analyses like gene assessments, a plague outbreak was explained to have been linked to body lice infected with B. quintana.

=== Bartonella bacilliformis ===
Documentation of verruga peruana–a Bartonella disease caused by B. bacilliformis–was first shown on Ecuadorian fiigurines in the 14th century.

Oroya fever–also caused by B. bacilliformis–is thought to have been recognized by South American Pre-Columbian Indians due to their use of the word, "sirki" or anemia that comes from the Quechua language. Verruga peruana and Oroya fever's cause was discovered in the 20th century when it was observed by Alberto Barton in red blood cells. The red blood cells came from sick individuals who were infected with Oroya fever.

Currently, past evidence of B. bacilliformis was documented in 1974. This evidence came from the 1960s where bacterial clusters had biological similarities to the Bartonella bacteria on a male corpse infected with verruga peruana. This corpse was dated back to the 10th century.

==== Carrion's disease ====
Carrion's disease is also known as Oroya fever. In 1885 Daniel Alcides Carrión–a Peruvian medical student–injected himself with verruga pathogens. After becoming ill from Oroya fever, he died, leading to Oroya fever also being referred to as "Carrion disease.”

Bartonella bacilliformis is the bacteria responsible for Carrion disease. Carrion's disease has two distinct phases, Oroya fever and verruga peruana. Oroya fever occurs after one's initial exposure to the B. bacilliformis bacteria and is considered the acute phase of the illness. Then, verruga peruana can occur after one's recovery from the bacteria and is considered the chronic phase of the disease.

== Infection cycle ==
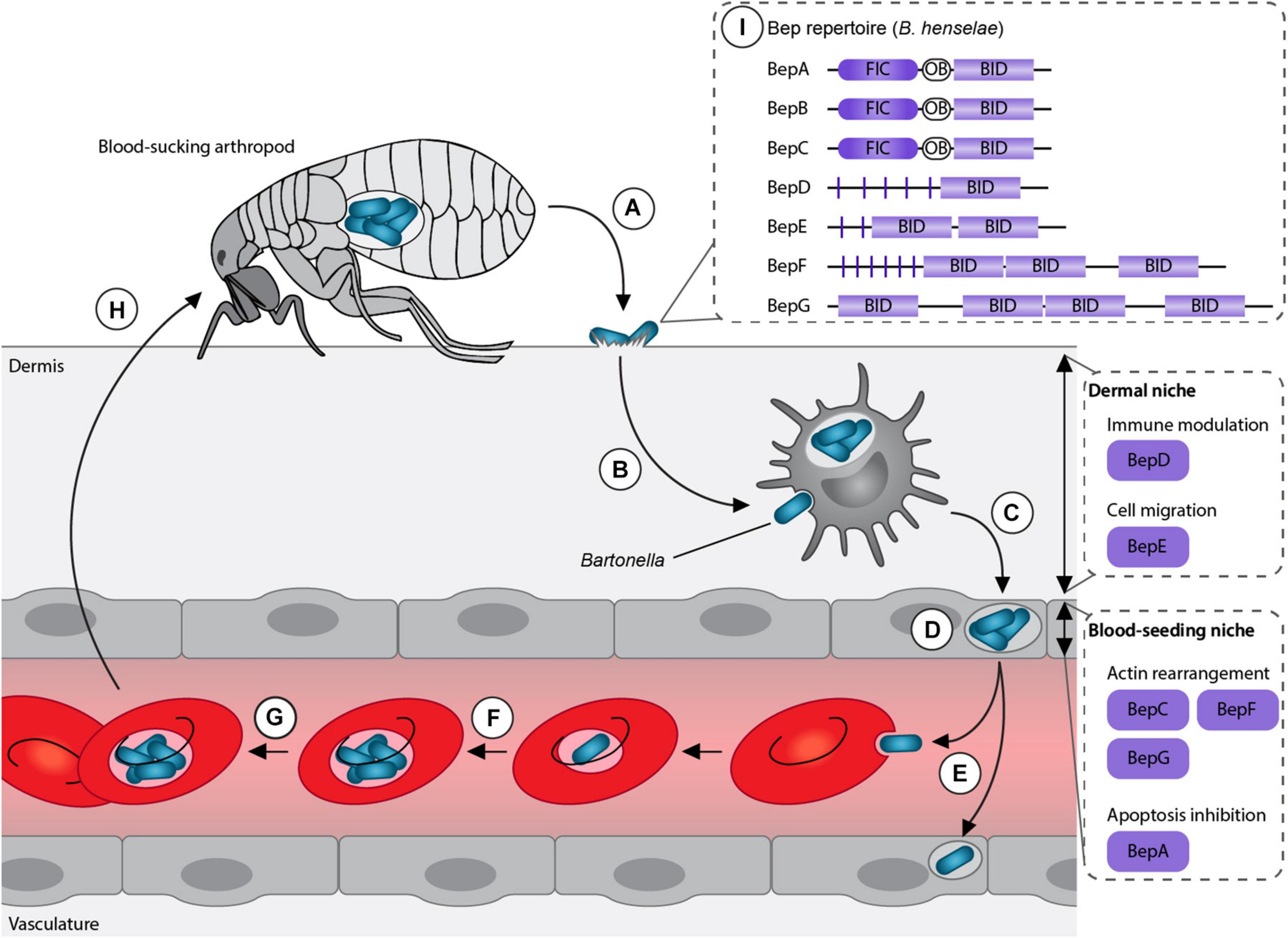
The infection cycle of most arthropod Bartonella pathogens, starting from the vector, going to the host, and then repeating the cycle with another vector.

Bartonella species are well-known to be transmissible to both animals and humans through various other vectors, such as fleas, lice, and sand flies. Bartonella bacteria are associated with cat-scratch disease, but a study in 2010 concluded, "Clinicians should be aware that ... a history of an animal scratch or bite is not necessary for disease transmission." All current Bartonella species identified in canines are human pathogens.

Mammal hosts, cat bites, and cat saliva have also been shown to spread the bacteria.

The arthropod Bartonella infection cycle starts through the bite of an insect, typically a flea, lice, or other common blood-sucking arthropods. The infected arthropod's bite causes the Bartonella bacteria to enter the host–human or animal. In the early stages of the bite, Bartonella cannot infect red blood cells immediately, causing the host to show no symptoms or signs of infection. Instead, the bacteria must find a "primary niche", or a temporary place of existence in the body to prepare for the next stage of infection.

From the primary niche, the Bartonella bacteria is able to move into the bloodstream. Once inside the bloodstream, the bacteria attaches to red blood cells, invades them, and either survives or dies inside of the cells.

During the infection process, a lack of immune response from the host is beneficial to the bacteria. Living inside the red blood cells helps the bacteria survive without being detected by the immune system. This overall process allows for the bacteria to stay in the blood. If another insect were to bite an infected host, the insect could then transmit the infection from one host to another due to the live bacteria in the original host's blood.

=== Bartonella transmission through ticks ===
There is mixed information on whether ticks can be a vector for Bartonella in humans. Ticks, such as Ixodes ricinus ticks, have been found to contract and transmit Bartonella bacteria from animals. However, there is no specific research that indicates that Ixodes ricinus ticks, or other tick species, have transmitted their Bartonella infection to humans, making it an area of ongoing research.

As of 2025, the Centers for Disease Control and Prevention states that there is no evidence of ticks being able to transmit Bartonella to humans.

One study in Austria found Bartonella DNA present in Ixodes ricinus ticks, but the study concluded that ticks are not a risk factor for humans in developing Bartonella species such as Bartonella henselae or Bartonella quintana. Since there are various ticks and Bartonella species, more research is needed to make causal links between tick species and Bartonella in animals.

== Acute Bartonella and Chronic Bartonella ==
Acute and chronic Bartonella are two different infections that individuals can develop after contracting the Bartonella bacilliformis bacteria.

=== Acute Bartonella ===
Acute Bartonella, also referred to as Oroya fever or Carrion's disease, is an infection caused by the Bartonella bacteria species, B. bacilliformis. Symptoms of acute Bartonella in humans include discomfort, headaches, fever, muscle aches, joint pain, increased sweating, skin growths, and swollen lymph nodes.

Relapses with Oroya Fever are rare. If acute Bartonella is left untreated, chronic Bartonella can develop. Animals that have acute Bartonella may also experience the same symptoms as humans; however, it varies based on the animal species. Bartonella's various bacterial species can also have different symptoms with varying degrees of severity.

=== Chronic Bartonella ===
Humans and animals that are infected with any strain of the pathogen can also develop chronic Bartonella, but it is particularly prevalent and associated with the B. bacilliformis pathogen. In humans, chronic Bartonella, or verruga peruana, is a condition characterized by tumor-like lesions that can appear on the skin anywhere from 2–8 weeks after exposure.

Symptoms of chronic Bartonella in humans include persistent low-grade fever, eye problems, bone pain, foot pain, anemia, and neurological issues. Eye problems include blurry vision or irritation and neurological problems can consist of brain fog, trouble sleeping, or poor balance. Additionally, shin pain is a common type of bone pain those infected may experience.

Animals can also develop chronic Bartonella with cats being a common species that develop chronic Bartonella from the bacteria.

While different, acute and chronic Bartonella are sometimes both treated by antibiotics. The type of antibiotic and duration is dependent on the Bartonella species. If chronic Bartonella is untreated, it can persist from months to years.

==== Complications ====
Multiple species of the pathogen can cause complications whether the infection is treated or not. Complications include anemia, neurological issues, fluid in the heart or lungs, organ swelling, eye swelling, and heart inflammation. Heart inflammation is the most serious complication from Bartonella infections.

Those with comorbidities or autoimmune diseases can also experience Bacillary angiomatosis, which is a medical condition that can create cysts on organs and bones in the human body. These cysts can develop on the skin and can appear red or dark. Bacillary peliosis can also occur, causing liver problems.

== Risk factors for developing Bartonella ==
Various lifestyles and pre-existing medical conditions can put someone at a higher risk for being infected with Bartonella. Individuals with weakened immune systems, such as those with Human Immunodeficiency Virus (HIV/AIDS), are at a higher risk of contracting Bartonella.

Immunocompromised individuals can also develop a worse, or more severe, case of Bartonella as well as other medical issues. Medical complications such as endocarditis and bacillary angiomatosis can develop and cause further medical complications for those infected.

Individuals who have pets, cats–animals that commonly carry Bartonella henselae–or cats with fleas have a higher likelihood of contracting a Bartonella bacteria. Through a cat's scratch, or contact with a cat's flea, B. henselae can be contracted. People experiencing homelessness or marginal housing are also at a higher risk of being infected with Bartonella quintana, a Bartonella species that can be spread through body lice infestation.

Additionally, many individuals who work with livestock are at risk for developing zoonotic diseases. Bartonella is a zoonotic bacteria and can increase farmers', or those who work with livestock, likelihood of being infected with it. Insect vectors that can transmit Bartonella, such as fleas, can be present in some farm animals, leading to farmer exposure. In one case, a sheep farmer contracted B. quintana after handling sheep.

== Vaccine ==
Currently, a vaccination for Bartonella does not exist. In one study done on mice, the CFA, or CAMP-like autofactor transporter that is specific to Bartonella, was found to protect mice against the Bartonella tribocorum species. However, CFAs, or a bacterial protein that the immune system targets, vary greatly across different Bartonella species.

While mice could receive a B. tribocorum vaccine and be protected from the bacterium, humans and mice would not be protected against other Bartonella bacteria. Human antibodies that will fight against a specific CFA may not be able to biologically recognize other Bartonella species. This non-recognition could lead to individuals becoming infected with other Bartonella bacteria. The strain variation currently poses a challenge for one vaccine to encompass and protect against various Bartonella species.

The research for a vaccine is ongoing and often consists of one type of Bartonella species being studied, such as Bartonella henselae. Various human trials of the vaccine will need to be completed before it can be fully implemented. Presently, Bartonella research consists largely of studying how it can be transmitted, what vectors transmit it, and the symptoms the bacteria causes. Since Bartonella vaccinations are not available for humans or animals, some actions and methods can prevent someone or something from contracting the bacteria.

== Preventative measures ==
Bartonellosis infections from Bartonella bacteria can be prevented in various ways. Pets should be protected from fleas, ticks and lice, and wounds should be covered during direct animal contact, specifically when handling cats. Scratches from animals should immediately be washed after receiving them, as well as hands and clothes after touching an animal. Individuals should especially wash their clothes and body in hot water if they come into direct contact with fleas. Additionally, covering skin with clothes when outdoors, wearing bug spray, showering regularly, and refraining from using other's personal items, like towels, can help prevent exposure risk.

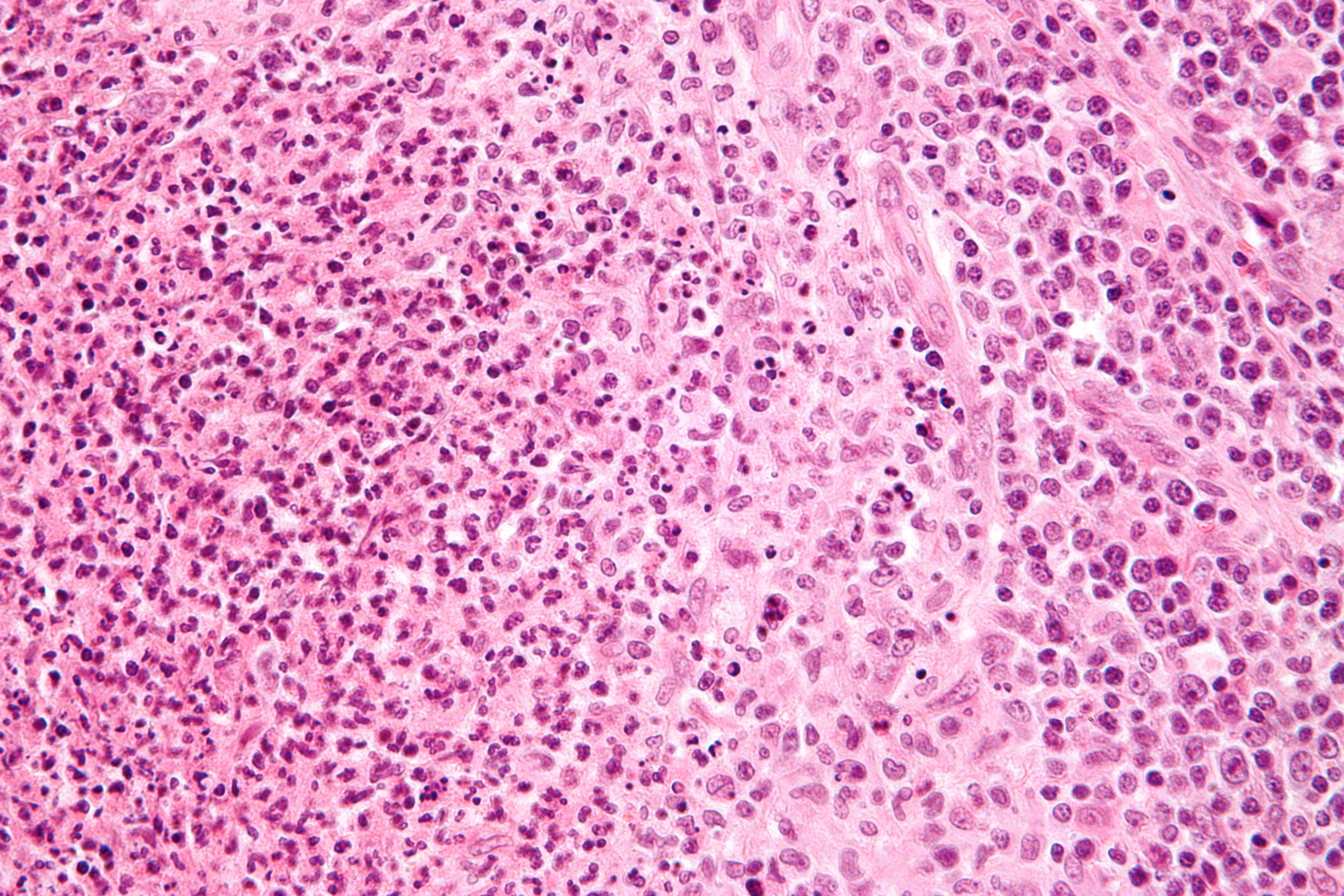
Cat-scratch disease under a microscope.

Individuals with weakened immune systems can also take further precautions to avoid contracting Bartonella henselae, which is primarily contracted from cats. These preventative methods include keeping pets indoors, avoiding contact with fleas and cats that have fleas, and stray cats.

== Pathophysiology ==
Bartonella infections can produce a wide range of symptoms. The course of the diseases (acute or chronic) and the underlying pathologies are variable.

Bartonella pathophysiology in humans
Species	Human reservoir or incidental host?	Animal reservoir	Pathophysiology	Distribution
B. bacilliformis	Reservoir		Causes Carrion's disease (Oroya fever, Verruga peruana)	Peru, Ecuador, and Colombia
B. quintana	Reservoir	Japanese macaque	Causes trench fever, bacillary angiomatosis, and endocarditis	Worldwide
B. clarridgeiae	Incidental	Domestic cat	Cat scratch disease	
B. elizabethae	Incidental	Rat	Endocarditis	
B. grahamii	Incidental	Mouse	Endocarditis and neuroretinitis	
B. henselae	Incidental	Domestic cat	Cat scratch disease, bacillary angiomatosis, peliosis hepatis, endocarditis, bacteremia with fever, neuroretinitis, meningitis, encephalitis	Worldwide
B. koehlerae	Incidental	Domestic cat		
B. naantaliensis	Reservoir	Myotis daubentonii		
B. vinsonii	Incidental	Mouse, dog, domestic cat	Endocarditis, bacteremia	
B. washoensis	Incidental	Squirrel	Myocarditis	
B. rochalimae	Incidental	Unknown	Carrion's disease-like symptoms	

== Treatment ==
Treatment is dependent on which species of Bartonella is found in an individual. While Bartonella species are susceptible to a number of standard antibiotics in vitro—macrolides and tetracycline, for example—the efficacy of antibiotic treatment in immunocompetent individuals is currently not known. Immunocompromised patients should be treated with antibiotics because they are particularly susceptible to systemic disease and bacteremia. Drugs of particular effectiveness include trimethoprim-sulfamethoxazole, gentamicin, ciprofloxacin, and rifampin; Bartonella henselae is generally resistant to penicillin, amoxicillin, and nafcillin.

Currently, the research on whether Bartonella infections can be shortened by treatments such as antibiotics is mixed. Additionally, Bartonella infections can become more complicated in some individuals, making the remedies different from standard treatment practices. Antibiotic treatments are agreed upon to aid the infection. Individuals with HIV should be treated with antibiotics. If exposure to a Bartonella bacterium turns into an infection that impacts the central nervous system, antibiotics are also needed. However, some Bartonella species can be treated on their own without the use of standard medications.

== Epidemiology ==
Homeless intravenous drug users are at high risk for Bartonella infections, particularly Bartonella elizabethae. Bartonella elizabethae seropositivity rates in this population range from 12.5% in Los Angeles, to 33% in Baltimore, Maryland, 46% in New York City, and 39% in Sweden.

== Phylogeny ==
The currently accepted taxonomy is based on the List of Prokaryotic names with Standing in Nomenclature (LPSN). The phylogeny is based on whole-genome analysis.

- - Bartonella
    - Bartonella apis
    - - - Bartonella ancashensis
        - Bartonella bacilliformis
      - - - - Bartonella schoenbuchensis
            - Bartonella bovis
          - - Bartonella rochalimae
            - Bartonella clarridgeiae
        - - Bartonella doshiae
          - - - Bartonella senegalensis
              - - Bartonella koehlerae
                - Bartonella henselae
            - - - Bartonella grahamii
                - - Bartonella elizabethae
                  - Bartonella tribocorum
              - - - Bartonella birtlesii
                  - Bartonella florencae
                - - Bartonella alsatica
                  - - Bartonella rattaustraliani
                    - Bartonella vinsonii
  - outgroup
    Brucellaceae
