= Bartonella silvatica =

Scientific classification
- Domain: Bacteria
- Kingdom: Pseudomonadati
- Phylum: Pseudomonadota
- Class: Alphaproteobacteria
- Order: Hyphomicrobiales
- Family: Bartonellaceae
- Genus: Bartonella
- Species: B. silvatica

Binomial name
- Bartonella silvatica Inoue et al. 2010

Type strain
- CIP 109862, Fuji 23-1, JCM 15566

Species of bacterium

Bartonella silvatica is an oxidase- and catalase-negative bacterium from the genus Bartonella isolated from the blood of the large Japanese field mouse Apodemus speciosus.
