= Bartonella tribocorum =

Scientific classification
- Domain: Bacteria
- Kingdom: Pseudomonadati
- Phylum: Pseudomonadota
- Class: Alphaproteobacteria
- Order: Hyphomicrobiales
- Family: Bartonellaceae
- Genus: Bartonella
- Species: B. tribocorum

Binomial name
- Bartonella tribocorum Heller et al. 1998

Species of bacterium

Bartonella tribocorum is a bacterium. As with other Bartonella species, it can cause disease in animals.

This particular species was first isolated from the blood of wild rats. It is distinguished by its trypsin-like activity, the absence of the ability to hydrolyse proline and tributyrin, its 16S rRNA and citrate synthase gene sequences. its type strain is IBS 506^{T}(CIP 105476^{T}).
