= Bartonella pachyuromydis =

Scientific classification
- Domain: Bacteria
- Kingdom: Pseudomonadati
- Phylum: Pseudomonadota
- Class: Alphaproteobacteria
- Order: Hyphomicrobiales
- Family: Bartonellaceae
- Genus: Bartonella
- Species: B. pachyuromydis

Binomial name
- Bartonella pachyuromydis Sato et al. 2013

Type strain
- FN15-2, JCM 17714, KCTC 23657

Species of bacterium

Bartonella pachyuromydis is a bacterium from the genus Bartonella which was isolated from a fat-tailed gerbil.
