= Bartonella jaculi =

Scientific classification
- Domain: Bacteria
- Kingdom: Pseudomonadati
- Phylum: Pseudomonadota
- Class: Alphaproteobacteria
- Order: Hyphomicrobiales
- Family: Bartonellaceae
- Genus: Bartonella
- Species: B. jaculi

Binomial name
- Bartonella jaculi Sato et al. 2013

Species of bacterium

Bartonella jaculi is a bacterium from the genus Bartonella which was isolated from the blood of Rodentia.
