= Bartonella capreoli =

Scientific classification
- Domain: Bacteria
- Kingdom: Pseudomonadati
- Phylum: Pseudomonadota
- Class: Alphaproteobacteria
- Order: Hyphomicrobiales
- Family: Bartonellaceae
- Genus: Bartonella
- Species: B. capreoli

Binomial name
- Bartonella capreoli Bermond et al. 2002

Species of pathogenic bacterium

Bartonella capreoli is a pathogenic bacteria first isolated from European ruminants. It is small, fastidious, aerobic, oxidase-negative, gram-negative and rod-shaped. Its type strain is IBS 193^{T} (= CIP 106691^{T} = CCUG 43827^{T}).
