= Bartonella peromysci =

Scientific classification
- Domain: Bacteria
- Kingdom: Pseudomonadati
- Phylum: Pseudomonadota
- Class: Alphaproteobacteria
- Order: Hyphomicrobiales
- Family: Bartonellaceae
- Genus: Bartonella
- Species: B. peromysci

Binomial name
- Bartonella peromysci (Birtles et al. 1995)

Species of bacterium

Bartonella peromysci is a species of gram-negative bacteria in the genus Bartonella. This species formerly belonging to the genus Grahamella. As with other Bartonella species, it can cause disease in animals.
