= Bartonella clarridgeiae =

Scientific classification
- Domain: Bacteria
- Kingdom: Pseudomonadati
- Phylum: Pseudomonadota
- Class: Alphaproteobacteria
- Order: Hyphomicrobiales
- Family: Bartonellaceae
- Genus: Bartonella
- Species: B. clarridgeiae

Binomial name
- Bartonella clarridgeiae Lawson and Collins 1996

Type strain
- ATCC 51734, Houston-2 cat

Species of bacterium

Bartonella clarridgeiae is a Gram-negative bacteria from the genus Bartonella which was first isolated in the United States. Bartonella clarridgeiae is a zoonotic pathogen which can cause cat scratch disease.
