= Bartonella taylorii =

Scientific classification
- Domain: Bacteria
- Kingdom: Pseudomonadati
- Phylum: Pseudomonadota
- Class: Alphaproteobacteria
- Order: Hyphomicrobiales
- Family: Bartonellaceae
- Genus: Bartonella
- Species: B. taylorii

Binomial name
- Bartonella taylorii (Birtles et al. 1995)

Species of bacterium

Bartonella taylorii is a bacterium. As with other Bartonella species, it can cause disease in animals.
