= Bartonella talpae =

Scientific classification
- Domain: Bacteria
- Kingdom: Pseudomonadati
- Phylum: Pseudomonadota
- Class: Alphaproteobacteria
- Order: Hyphomicrobiales
- Family: Bartonellaceae
- Genus: Bartonella
- Species: B. talpae

Binomial name
- Bartonella talpae (Ristic and Kreier 1984 ex Brumpt 1911) Birtles et al. 1995

Synonyms
- Grahamella talpae (ex Brumpt 1911) Ristic and Kreier 1984

Species of bacterium

Bartonella talpae, formerly belonging to the Grahamella genus, is a bacterium. As with other Bartonella species, it can cause disease in animals.
