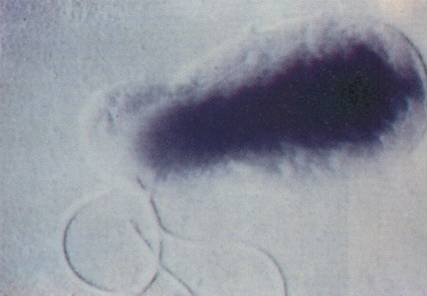
- Bartonella bacterium

Scientific classification
- Domain: Bacteria
- Kingdom: Pseudomonadati
- Phylum: Pseudomonadota
- Class: Alphaproteobacteria
- Order: Hyphomicrobiales
- Family: Bartonellaceae
- Genus: Bartonella
- Species: B. bacilliformis

Binomial name
- Bartonella bacilliformis (Strong et al. 1913) Strong et al. 1915

Synonyms
- Bartonia bacilliformis Strong et al. 1913

= Bartonella bacilliformis =

Species of bacterium

Bartonella bacilliformis is a gram-negative, pleomorphic, flagellated, coccobacillus and a facultative intracellular bacterium. It is the primary causative agent of Carrion's disease, which is transmitted by the bite of sand flies from the genus Lutzomyia and is endemic to the Andean regions of Peru and its surrounding regions. Carrión’s disease has been documented in the Andes regions for centuries, but the bacterium was not reported until 1909 by the Peruvian microbiologist Alberto Barton.

The disease has two distinct phases. The acute phase, Oroya fever, begins with the infection and destruction of red blood cells, causing severe anemia and immunosuppression. When not treated it is highly fatal, and many of its causative deaths are due to opportunistic secondary infections. The chronic phase, verruga peruana (Peruvian warts), involves the invasion of endothelial cells. This triggers an angiogenic response that produces large vascular lesions, typically found on the arms and legs.

== History ==
Carrión’s disease has been prevalent in the Andes for centuries. Journals kept by Spanish conquistadors in the 16th century describe the illness, specifically its chronic phase, verruga peruana (Peruvian Warts), and its acute phase Oroya fever, in detail. Historically the relationship between verruga peruana and Oroya fever was completely unknown, as they were believed to be separate diseases. In 1885, Daniel Alcides Carrión inoculated himself with material from a patient with verruga peruana. He then developed Oroya fever and died, demonstrating the conditions were not separate, but phases of one disease.

The causative organism was first observed by Alberto Barton in 1905, though was not published until 1909. Barton described the structures discovered as endoglobular, as they were living inside of host red blood cells. The species was initially designated as Bartonia bacilliformis in honor of Alberto Barton, but the genus was later changed to Bartonella in 1915. B. bacilliformis was the only member of the Bartonella genus until 1993, and has now grown to encompass over 40 species.

== Epidemiology ==
Bartonella bacilliformis is found in regions of Peru and Ecuador. A study conducted in Peru found B. bacilliformis in the blood samples from patients experiencing acute fever, while a study in Ecuador found that children in the Andean highlands had also been exposed to the bacterium. Researchers have also reported cases of Oroya fever and verruga peruana in Colombia. Sandflies are believed to be the mode of transmission. The bacterium is transmitted by sandflies of the genera Pintomyia and Lutzomyia. Researchers suggest that the spread of B. bacilliformis may be influenced by the changing climate associated with El Niño. The rainy season in Peru may be associated with an increase in acute cases of Carrion's disease, potentially due to an increase in sandfly populations. The chronic cases do not appear to show a noticeable difference between seasons.

A study conducted in a Peruvian community in 1997 to 1999 discovered that children under five years old had the highest incidence of B. bacilliformis. Researchers found two major predictors of the disease, age and infection in a family member.

Although the primary mode of transmission for Bartonella bacilliformis is through sandfly bites, infection may also occur through blood transfusions. Two documented cases of this occurred in 1972 and 2014. In 1972, a new born received a blood transfusion from a family member that lived in Peru and subsequently passed away from Oroya fever. In 2014, a 47 year old patient received multiple blood transfusions due to an illness and was later diagnosed with Oroya fever.

== Microbiology ==
Bartonella bacilliformis is a Gram-negative bacterium belonging to the class Alphaproteobacteria. It is pleomorphic, with cells measuring approximately 0.2 to 0.5 µm wide and 1 to 3 µm long. Unlike most other Bartonella species, B. bacilliformis is highly motile due to its multiple polar flagella. This high level of motility increases its movement within the host blood stream, contributing to its ability to attach to and invade red blood cells. Antibodies targeting the flagella of B. bacilliformis have demonstrated the ability to reduce the bacteria's ability to attach to and invade red blood cells.

B. bacilliformis requires external sources of heme, an iron containing compound necessary for bacterial growth Most pathogens in the Bartonella genus require a temperature similar to that of the human body (35-37 °C) to grow. B. bacilliformis differs, typically being cultivated at approximately 28 °C. Laboratory growth generally involves blood-enriched agar. Columbia blood agar containing 5% sheep blood has been demonstrated as sufficient for growth.

B. bacilliformis can be difficult to isolate due to its slow initial growth rate. Colonies of B. bacilliformis are small and round. The bacterium has been observed to shift between the highly motile bacilli shape, and a non-motile coccoid form during sand fly colonization. Two different subgroups of B. bacilliformis have been found based on dissimilarity in the ialB, gltA and rpoB genes.

== Pathophysiology ==
Arrows indicating adhesin A, a protein matrix on the surface of B. bacilliformis that aids in attachment to host cells.

B. bacilliformis enters the human blood stream from the bite of an infected sandfly. Once inside the vessel, B. bacilliformis uses its flagella along with a trimeric autotransporter adhesin, adhesin A, to attach to erythrocyte cell membranes. It breaks through the erythrocyte membranes and eventually causes the cells to lyse. The suspected mechanism of action for this hemolysis is a dynamic between porin A and ⍺/β-hydrolase. These membrane proteins attach to the cell membrane and act as a phospholipase to break it down. The rapid hemolysis, and anemia resulting from it, marks the acute phase of infection called Oroya fever.

When the bacterium invades endothelial cells, it presents as the chronic manifestation of the disease, verruga peruana. This chronic phase consists of benign skin eruptions with raised, reddish-purple nodules (angiomatous tumours). In response to B. bacilliformis entry, infected endothelium induces angiogenesis through angiopoietin-2, and the surrounding layers of epidermis begin to release a growth factor, which present as the verruga peruana skin lesions.

== Genome ==
Bartonella bacilliformis contains a single circular chromosome. The strain KC584 was studied and has a genome with approximately 1.41 million base pairs, and 38.2% of those DNA bases consist of guanine (G) or cytosine (C). There are multiple strains of B. bacilliformis that are all a part of the same species, but their DNA sequences can vary slightly. A study from 2023 examined 20 bacterial samples that were collected from patients from the Peruvian regions of Ancash and Cajamarca. Researchers used variations of three genes, ialB, gltA, and rpoB, and found evidence that suggests the microbe can be divided into two subgroups.

== Disease ==
Bartonella bacilliformis is the etiologic agent of Carrion's disease or Oroya fever (acute phase of infection), and verruga peruana or Peruvian wart (chronic phase of infection). The acute phase of the disease is a life-threatening disease characterized by massive invasion of Bartonella to human red blood cells and consequently acute hemolysis and fever. If the infection is not treated, the case fatality rate is 40 to 85% Patients in this phase of the infection can be complicated by overwhelming infections, primarily by enterobacteria (Salmonella spp) and parasites (Toxoplasma gondii, Pneumocystis jirovecii). The chronic phase is characterized by benign eruptive lesions that are pruritic and bleeding, and other symptoms like malaise and osteoarticular pain. Bartonella can be isolated from blood cultures and secretion of the lesions in people from endemic areas.

== Diagnosis ==
Carrion's disease can be diagnosed with several different methods including PCR, peripheral blood smears, and blood cultures. The acute phase can be diagnosed using peripheral blood smears, although this test has shown in some studies to have a low sensitivity. Blood cultures can also be used in diagnosis, but because of the bacteria's slow-growing nature, blood cultures may require prolonged incubation. Polymerase chain reaction (PCR) has also showed useful in its diagnostic capabilities. Various approaches have been tested in PCR diagnosis, and detection of the microbes 16s rRNA has proven most effective.

== Treatment ==
Before the antibiotic era, the only treatment for the acute phase was blood transfusion, but the effectiveness of this treatment was poor and the mortality rate was high. Currently, antibiotics are the primary recommended treatment with several effective options available depending on specific cases and severity. More than one antibiotic can be used for treatment, with effective options including fluoroquinolones, cephalosporins, macrolides, and rifampin.

Some antibiotic resistance has been noted in B. bacilliformis. One study examining isolates from Peru have shown significant resistance to the antibiotic Ciprofloxacin. In this study of 38 bacterial isolates, 63.2% were classified as resistant to this antibiotic. The mechanism for this resistance has been associated with amino acid substitution in GyrA and GyrB, subunits of the DNA gyrase. Specifically, substitutions of S_{474}F in GyrB alone, or a combination of this substitution with D_{95}N in GyrA have been attributed to resistance.
