= Bartonella quintana =

Scientific classification
- Domain: Bacteria
- Kingdom: Pseudomonadati
- Phylum: Pseudomonadota
- Class: Alphaproteobacteria
- Order: Hyphomicrobiales
- Family: Bartonellaceae
- Genus: Bartonella
- Species: B. quintana

Binomial name
- Bartonella quintana (Schmincke 1917) Brenner et al. 1993

Synonyms
- Rochalimaea quintana (Schmincke 1917) Krieg 1961; Wolhynia qintanae Zhdanov and Korenblit 1950; Rickettsia wolhynica Jungmann and Kuczynski 1918; Rickettsia weigli Mosing 1936; Rickettsia quintana Schmincke 1917; Rickettsia pediculi Munk and da Rocha-Lima 1917; Burnetia (Rocha-limae) wolhynica Macchiavello 1947

Species of bacterium

Bartonella quintana, originally known as Rochalimaea quintana, and "Rickettsia quintana", is a bacterium transmitted by the human body louse that causes trench fever. This bacterial species caused outbreaks of trench fever affecting 1 million soldiers in Europe during World War I. Trench fever is known to have affected millions of individuals throughout the 20th century.

== Genome ==
B. quintana had an estimated genome size of 1,700 to 2,174 kilo-base pairs., but the first genome sequence (of strain RM-11) contains a single circular chromosome of 1,587,646 base pairs. The overall guanine-cytosine (G+C) content of the genome is approximately 38.5%. The genome contains several insertion sequence (IS) elements and prophage regions, indicating past horizontal gene transfer events. These elements may contribute to genomic plasticity and adaptation.

== Background and characteristics ==
B. quintana is a fastidious, aerobic, Gram-negative(−), pole rod-shaped (bacillus) bacterium. The infection caused by this microorganism, trench fever, was first documented in soldiers during World War I. The term "trench fever" was first introduced in 1915 during World War I. It describes a febrile illness characterized by sudden onset of headache, dizziness, severe shin pain and high fever that typically exhibits a relapsing pattern. It occurs in Europe, Asia, and North Africa. Its primary vector is Pediculus humanus variety corporis, also known as the human body louse.

It was first isolated in axenic culture by J.W. Vinson in 1960, from a patient in Mexico City and named Rickettsia quintana. He infected volunteers with the bacterium, showing consistent symptoms and clinical manifestations of trench fever, proving etiology via Koch's postulates.

While trench fever was prominently documented during World War I, evidence suggests that B. quintana has affected humans for millennia. DNA analysis identified B. quintana in the dental pulp of a 4,000-year-old human tooth, indicating its presence in ancient populations. B. quintana DNA was also detected in lice from a mass grave of soldiers from Napoleon's army, suggesting its role in historical epidemics.

Upon the conclusion of World War I, reports of trench fever declined. However, since the 1990s, B. quintana has reemerged, particularly among impoverished and homeless populations in urban settings. It is believed that factors such as poor hygiene, crowded living conditions, and body louse infestations have contributed to this resurgence.

The best medium for growing Bartonella quintana is blood-enriched agar at an atmosphere containing 5% carbon dioxide.

Rickettsia quintana was later reclassified as Rochalimaea quintana and subsequently Bartonella quintana.

== Pathophysiology ==
The genome encodes various factors implicated in virulence and host interaction:

- Type IV Secretion Systems (T4SS): B. quintana utilizes two distinct T4SSs. The VirB/VirD4 System translocates effector proteins into host cells, manipulating host cellular functions to facilitate bacterial uptake and survival. The Trw system mediates host-specific adhesion to erythrocytes, a critical step for establishing infection. These systems are essential for the bacterium to gain access and colonize the mammalian host's cells
- Trimeric Autotransporter Adhesins (TAAs): B. quintana expresses variably expressed outer membrane proteins (Vomps), which are classified as TAAs. These proteins facilitate adhesion to host cells and promote auto aggregation, enhancing the bacterium's ability to establish infection.
- Hemolysis: While specific hemolysins in B. quintana have not been extensively characterized, related Bartonella species produce hemolysins that lyse red blood cells, releasing nutrients essential for bacterial survival.

Although lice are animal vectors, humans (and some other primates) are the only known animal reservoir hosts for this bacterium in vivo. It infects endothelial cells and can infect erythrocytes by binding and entering with a large vacuole. Once inside, they begin to proliferate and cause nuclear atypia (intraerythrocytic B.quintana colonization). This leads to apoptosis being suppressed, pro-inflammatory cytokines are released, and vascular proliferation increases. All of these processes result in patients possessing systemic symptoms (chills, fever, diaphoresis), bacteremia, and lymphatic enlargement. A major role in B. quintana infection is its lipopolysaccharide covering which is an antagonist of the toll-like receptor 4. The reason this infection might persist is because this organism also results in monocytes overproducing interleukin-10 (IL-10), thus weakening the immune response.

B. quintana also induces lesions seen in bacillary angiomatosis that protrude into vascular lumina, often occluding blood flow; they are seen in B. quintana-induced endocarditis patients. The enhanced growth of these cells is believed to be due to the secretion of angiogenic factors, thus inducing neovascularization. Release of an icosahedral particle, 40 nm in length, has been detected in cultures of B. quintana's close relative, B. henselae. This particle contains a 14-kb linear DNA segment, but its function in Bartonella pathophysiology is still unknown.

Notably, endocarditis is a new manifestation of the infection, not seen in World War I troops.

== Ecology and epidemiology ==
The primary vector of B. quintana is the human body louse. Transmission occurs when feces of infected lice come into contact with skin or mucosal membranes of the organism in proximity. The feces that contain the bacteria often come into contact with open skin through scratching.

Humans are considered the primary reservoirs for B. quintana. Recent studies have demonstrated non-human primates, such as macaques, as potential reservoirs, suggesting a broader ecological niche than previously recognized.

B. quintana infection occurs on every continent except Antarctica. Infections have been associated with risk factors such as poverty, alcoholism and homelessness. In a French seroprevalence study from 1996, 16% of hospitalized homeless patients were infected, as opposed to 1.8% of nonhospitalized homeless persons, and 0% of blood donors at large. In Canada, cases have been documented among Indigenous communities with limited access to water and sanitation. Understanding the ecology and epidemiology of B. quintana is crucial for developing targeted public health interventions, particularly in vulnerable populations. Improving living conditions, enhancing access to hygiene facilities, and implementing effective louse control measures are essential strategies to reduce the burden of B. quintana infections.

Lice are the key component in transmitting B. quintana. This has been attributed to living in unsanitary conditions, i.e. without consistent access to shower and laundry, and living in crowded areas, where the risk of coming into contact with other individuals carrying B. quintana and ectoparasites like body lice is increased. Also noteworthy, the increasing migration worldwide may also play a role in spreading trench fever, from areas where it is endemic to susceptible populations in urban areas. Recent concern is the possibility of the emergence of new strains of B. quintana through horizontal gene transfer, which could result in the acquisition of other virulence factors.

== Clinical manifestations ==
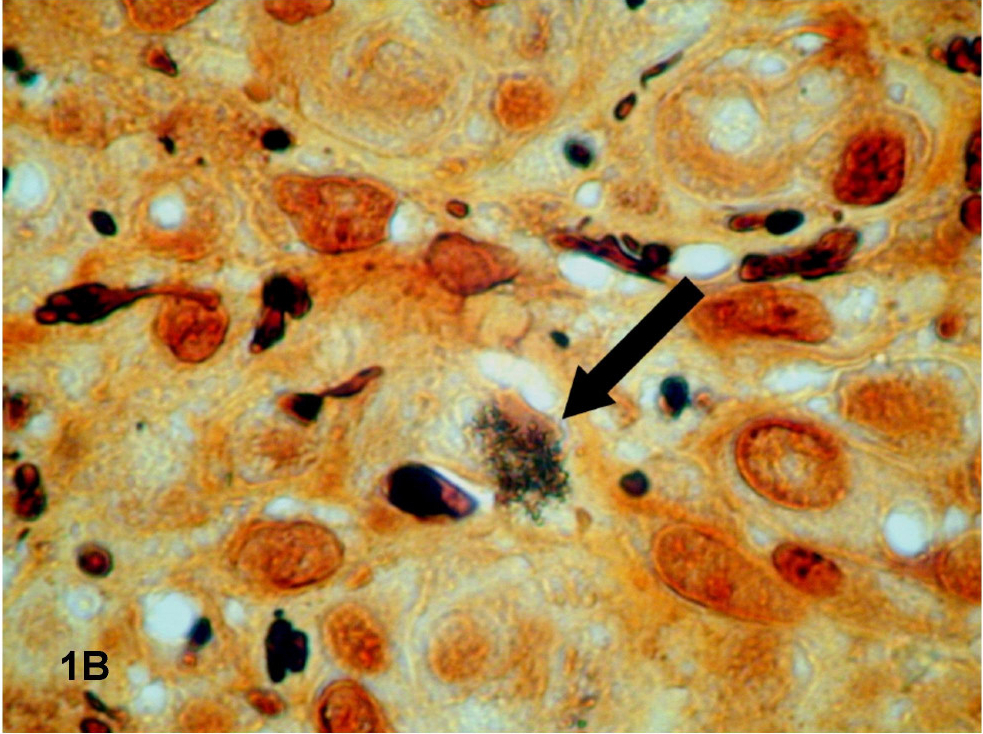
B. quintana and Mycobacterium avium complex coinfecting an AIDS patient

The clinical manifestations of B. quintana infection are highly variable. The incubation period is now known to be 5–20 days; it was originally thought to be 3–38 days. The infection can start as an acute onset of a febrile episode, relapsing febrile episodes, or as a persistent typhoidal illness; commonly seen are maculopapular rashes, conjunctivitis, headache, and myalgias, with splenomegaly being less common. Most patients present with pain in the lower legs (shins), sore muscles of the legs and back, and hyperaesthesia of the shins. Rarely is B. quintana infection fatal, unless endocarditis develops and goes untreated. If endocarditis does develop it is classified as culture negative. Weight loss, and thrombocytopenia are sometimes also seen. Recovery can take up to a month. Persistent presence of bacteria in the bloodstream has been observed, especially among individuals experiencing homelessness. A rare manifestation of the disease is leukocytoclastic vasculitis, characterized by fibrinoid necrosis of the vessel walls in the dermis.

Primary Symptoms that classify the disease include:

- Fever: patients often experience recurrent febrile episodes that last approximately 4 - 5 days. in between these intervals, the patient will be asymptomatic during a similar period of time. This pattern came to be known as "quintan fever".
- Headache: it is common for patients to experience severe headaches.
- Bone Pain: severe pain particularly in the shins, neck, and back, is frequently reported.
- Rash: Patients are known to develop a maculopapular rash in the trunk region.

It is important to point out that although some patients may remain asymptomatic, others can develop severe life-threatening complications. It is crucial for timely recognition and appropriate management for optimal disease control.

== Diagnosis and treatment ==
A definite diagnosis of infection with B. quintana requires either serum antibodies or positive nucleic acid amplification. To differentiate between different species, immunofluorescence assays that use mouse antisera are used, as well as DNA hybridization and restriction fragment length polymorphisms, or citrate synthase gene sequencing. Clinical diagnostic methods include the following:

- Serological testing: Detection of specific antibodies against B. quintana can be achieved using indirect immunofluorescence assays (IFA) or enzyme-linked immunosorbent assays (ELISA). A fourfold rise in antibody titers between acute and convalescent sera is indicative of recent infection.
- Molecular testing: Polymerase chain reaction (PCR) amplification of B. quintana-specific DNA sequences from blood or tissue samples enhances diagnostic sensitivity. This method is especially employed in cases where serology is inconclusive.
- Culture: Isolation of B. quintana in culture has proven challenging due to its slow-growing nature and specific growth requirements. When successful, it provides definitive diagnosis but is less commonly employed in routine clinical settings.

Treatment of infection includes the following methods:

- Treatment usually consists of a 4- to 6-week course of doxycycline as first-line, or erythromycin, or azithromycin. In cases of endocarditis or severe infections, combination therapy with doxycycline and an aminoglycoside (e.g., gentamicin) for 4–6 weeks is recommended.
- Supportive care: Management of complications, such as heart failure in endocarditis, is essential.
