= Bartonellosis =

Infection by bacteria of genus Bartonella

- Specialty: Infectious diseases

Bartonellosis is an infectious disease caused by bacteria of the genus Bartonella. Bartonella species cause diseases such as Carrión's disease, trench fever, cat-scratch disease, bacillary angiomatosis, peliosis hepatis, chronic bacteremia, endocarditis, chronic lymphadenopathy, and neurological disorders.

== Presentation ==
=== Carrión's disease ===
Patients can develop two clinical phases: an acute septic phase and a chronic eruptive phase associated with skin lesions. In the acute phase (also known as Oroya fever or fiebre de la Oroya), B. bacilliformis infection is a sudden, potentially life-threatening infection associated with high fever and decreased levels of circulating red blood cells (i.e., hemolytic anemia) and transient immunosuppression. B. bacilliformis is considered the most deadly species to date, with a death rate of up to 90% during the acute phase, which typically lasts two to four weeks. Peripheral blood smears show anisomacrocytosis with many bacilli adherent to red blood cells. Thrombocytopenia is also seen and can be very severe. Neurologic manifestations (neurobartonellosis) are altered mental status, agitation, or even coma, ataxia, spinal meningitis, or paralysis. It is seen in 20% of patients with acute infection, in which the prognosis is very guarded with about 50% mortality. The most feared complication is an overwhelming infection mainly by Enterobacteriaceae, particularly Salmonella (both S. typhi and S. non-typhi, as well as reactivation of toxoplasmosis and other opportunistic infections.

The chronic manifestation consists of a benign skin eruption with raised, reddish-purple nodules (angiomatous tumours). The bacterium can be seen microscopically if a skin biopsy is silver stained (the Warthin–Starry method).

=== Cat-scratch disease ===
Cat-scratch disease is due to an infection by B. henselae. It manifests as gradual regional lymph nodes enlargement (axilla, groin, neck) which may last 2–3 months or longer, and a distal scratch and/or red-brown skin papule (not always seen at the time of the disease). The enlarged lymph node is painful and tender. The lymph nodes may suppurate, and some patients remain afebrile or asymptomatic. Other presentations include fever (particularly in children), Parinaud's oculoglandular syndrome, encephalopathy, and neuroretinitis.

B. henselae can be associated with bacteremia, bacillary angiomatosis, and peliosis hepatis in HIV patients, and bacteremia and endocarditis in immunocompetent and immunocompromised patients. Symptoms may include fatigue, headaches, fever, memory loss, disorientation, insomnia, and loss of coordination. The bacteria block the normal immune response by suppressing the NF-κB apoptosis pathway. Disease progression may be accelerated if the host is subsequently infected by an immune-suppressing virus such as Epstein-Barr.

=== Bacillary angiomatosis ===
B. henselae and B. quintana can cause bacillary angiomatosis, a vascular proliferative disease involving mainly the skin, and other organs. The disease was first described in human immunodeficiency virus (HIV) patients and organ transplant recipients. Severe, progressive and disseminated disease may occur in HIV patients. Differential diagnoses include Kaposi's sarcoma, pyogenic granuloma, hemangioma, verruga peruana, and subcutaneous tumors. Lesions can affect bone marrow, liver, spleen, or lymph nodes.

=== Peliosis hepatis ===
B. henselae is the etiologic agent for peliosis hepatis, which is defined as a vascular proliferation of sinusoid hepatic capillaries resulting in blood-filled spaces in the liver in HIV patients and organ transplant recipients. Peliosis hepatis can be associated with peliosis of the spleen, as well as bacillary angiomatosis of the skin in HIV patients.

=== Trench fever ===
Trench fever, also known as five-day fever or quintan fever, is the initial manifestation of B. quintana infection. Clinical manifestations range from asymptomatic infection to severe illness. Classical presentations include a febrile illness of acute onset, headache, dizziness, and shin pain. Chronic infection manifestations include attacks of fever and aching in some cases and persistent bacteremia in soldiers and homeless people.

== Microbiology ==
Members of the genus Bartonella are facultative intracellular bacteria, alpha 2 subgroup Pseudomonadota. The genus comprises:

Bartonella species	Reservoir	Disease
Bartonella bacilliformis	human	Carrion's disease / verruga Peruana
Bartonella quintana	human	Trench fever, bacteremia, bacillary angiomatosis, endocarditis
Bartonella henselae	cats	Cat-scratch disease, bacillary angiomatosis, bacteremia, endocarditis, encephalitis, meningitis
Bartonella elizabethae	rats	Endocarditis
Bartonella grahamii		Retinitis
Bartonella vinsoni	dogs	Endocarditis, bacteremia
Bartonella washonsis	rodents	Myocarditis
Bartonella clarridgiae	cats	Bacteremia
Bartonella rochalimae	human	Carrion's disease-like syndrome

== Pathophysiology ==
In mammals, each Bartonella species is highly adapted to its reservoir host as the result of intracellular parasitism and can persist in the host's bloodstream. Intraerythrocytic parasitism is only observed in the acute phase of Carrion's disease. Bartonella species also have a tropism for endothelial cells, observed in the chronic phase of Carrion's disease (also known as verruga Peruana) and bacillary angiomatosis. Pathological response can vary with the immune status of the host. Infection with B. henselae can result in a focal suppurative reaction (CSD in immunocompetent patients), a multifocal angioproliferative response (bacillary angiomatosis in immunocompromised patients), endocarditis, or meningitis.

== Diagnosis ==
There are several methods used for diagnosing Bartonella infection including microscopy, serology, and PCR. Microscopy of blood smears is used to diagnose Carrión's disease (B. bacilliformis), however for other Bartonella species, microscopy and silver staining are insensitive, not highly specific, and cannot differentiate species. The CDC does not recommend lymph node aspiration for diagnostic purposes.

=== Serology and protein-based methods ===
IFA (immunofluorescence antibody assay) testing for the presence of antibodies in serum is used to diagnose B. henselae infection at the acute onset of Cat Scratch Disease symptoms, followed by PCR to confirm infecting species. IFA can generally be used to confirm a diagnosis of Bartonella infection but is limited by antibody cross-reactivity with other bacteria species which can cause a false positive, and antigen variability which can result in false negatives.

Bartonella spp. often evade an immune response, thus antibodies may not be detected even concurrent with an infection, resulting in an IFA false negative rate of up to 83% in chronically infected patients when other test results (e.g. organism isolation or PCR) are positive. IFA sensitivity may range from 14 to 100%, causing discrepancies between PCR and serology test results. Positive IFA results do not distinguish between current infection and prior exposure.

ELISA (enzyme-linked immunosorbent assay) is another method that has been used to detect Bartonella, but it has a low sensitivity (17-35%). Western blot for protein detection of Bartonella-associated proteins has also been reported, but this method does not show clear immunoreactive profiles.

=== PCR ===
The CDC states that PCR testing from a single blood draw is not sufficiently sensitive for B. henselae testing, and can result in high false negative rates due to a small sample volume and levels below the limit of molecular detection.

Bartonella spp. are fastidious, slow-growing bacteria that are difficult to grow using traditional solid agar plate culture methods due to complex nutritional requirements and potentially a low number of circulating bacteria. This conventional method of culturing Bartonella spp. from blood inoculates plated directly onto solid agar plates requires an extended incubation period of 21 days due to the slow growth rate.

=== Enrichment Culture ===
Bartonella growth rates improve when cultured in an enrichment inoculation step in a liquid insect-based medium such as Bartonella Alphaproteobacteria Growth Medium (BAPGM) or Schneider's Drosophila-based insect powder medium. Several studies have optimized the growing conditions of Bartonella spp. cultures in these liquid media, with no change in bacterial protein expressions or host interactions in vitro. Insect-based liquid media supports the growth and co-culturing of at least seven Bartonella species, reduces bacterial culturing time and facilitates PCR detection and isolation of Bartonella spp. from animal and patient samples. Research shows that DNA may be detected following direct extraction from blood samples and become negative following enrichment culture, thus PCR is recommended after direct sample extraction and also following incubation in enrichment culture. Several studies have successfully optimized sensitivity and specificity by using PCR amplification (pre-enrichment PCR) and enrichment culturing of blood draw samples, followed by PCR (post-enrichment PCR) and DNA sequence identification.

=== Serial Testing ===
As Bartonella spp. infect at low levels and cycle between blood and tissues, multiple blood draws over time may be necessary to detect infection.

== Treatment ==
Treatment of infections caused by Bartonella species include:

Disease	Adults	Children
Cat-scratch disease	Azithromycin + Rifampin	Unknown
Retinitis	Doxycycline + rifampin	unknown
Trench fever or chronic bacteremia by B. quintana	Doxycycline + gentamicin	unknown
Bacillary angiomatosis	Erythromycin or doxycycline	Erythromycin
Peliosis hepatis	Erythromycin or doxycycline	Erythromycin
Endocarditis	Doxycycline + gentamicin + rifampin or ceftriaxone + gentamicin	
Carrión's disease (acute phase)	Ciprofloxacin or chloramphenicol	Chloramphenicol + beta-lactam
Carrión's disease (chronic phase)	Rifampin or macrolides	Rifampin or macrolides

Some authorities recommend the use of azithromycin.

== Epidemiology ==
Carrión's disease, or Oroya fever or Peruvian wart is a rare infectious disease found only in Peru, Ecuador, and Colombia. It is endemic in some areas of Peru, is caused by infection with the bacterium Bartonella bacilliformis, and transmitted by sandflies of genus Lutzomyia.

Cat scratch disease occurs worldwide. Cats are the main reservoir of Bartonella henselae, and the bacterium is transmitted to cats by the cat flea Ctenocephalides felis. Infection in cats is very common with a prevalence estimated between 40 and 60%, younger cats being more commonly infective. Cats usually become immune to the infection, while dogs may be very symptomatic. Humans may also acquire it through flea or tick bites from infected dogs, cats, coyotes, and foxes.

Trench fever, produced by Bartonella quintana infection, is transmitted by the human body louse Pediculus humanus corporis. Humans are the only known reservoir. Thorough washing of clothing may help to interrupt the transmission of infection.

A possible role for ticks in the transmission of Bartonella species remains to be elucidated; in November 2011, Bartonella rochalimae, B. quintana, and B. elizabethae DNA was first reported in Rhipicephalus sanguineus and Dermacentor nitens ticks in Peru.

== History ==
=== Carrión's disease ===
The disease was named after medical student Daniel Alcides Carrión from Cerro de Pasco, Peru. Carrión described the disease after being inoculated at his request with the pus of a skin lesion from patient Carmen Paredes in 1885 by Doctor Evaristo M. Chávez, a close friend and coworker in Dos de Mayo National Hospital. Carrión developed the disease three weeks after the inoculation and kept a meticulous record of clinical symptoms and signs until the disease rendered him incapable of the task and he died at age 28 several weeks later—October 5, 1885. Carrión proved that Oroya fever and verruga peruana were two stages of the same disease and not two different diseases as was thought at the time. His work did not result in a cure immediately, but his research started the process. Peru has named October 5 as "Peruvian Medicine Day" in his honor.

Peruvian microbiologist Alberto Barton discovered the causative bacterium in 1905, but his results were not published until 1909. Barton originally identified them as "endoglobular" structures, bacteria living inside red blood cells. Until 1993, the genus Bartonella, within the family Bartonellaceae, contained only one species; 23 are now identified.

=== CSD ===
In 1988, English et al. isolated and cultured a bacterium that was named Afipia felis in 1992 after the team at the Armed Forces Institute of Pathology that discovered it. This agent was considered the cause of cat-scratch Disease (CSD) but further studies failed to support this conclusion. Serologic studies associated CSD with Bartonella henselae, reported in 1992. In 1993, Dolan isolated Rochalimae henselae (now called Bartonella henselae) from lymph nodes of patients with CSD.

Bartonella spp. are commonly treated with antibiotics including azithromycin, based on a single small randomized clinical trial. Treatment may take up to one year to eliminate the disease. CSD often resolves spontaneously without treatment.

=== Trench fever ===
Detailed descriptions of the disease were reported in soldiers during the First World War. It is also known as five-day fever, quintan fever, Wolhinie fever, and urban trench fever because it occurs in homeless people and alcoholics .
