= Charles Henry Tyler Townsend =

American entomologist (1863–1944)

- Born: December 5, 1863; Oberlin, Ohio, U.S.
- Died: March 17, 1944 (aged 80); Itaquaquecetuba, Brazil
- Education: Columbian University
- Spouse: Caroline (died 1903)
- Scientific career
- Fields: Entomology

Charles Henry Tyler Townsend (December 5, 1863 – March 17, 1944) was an American entomologist specializing in the study of tachinids (Tachinidae), a large and diverse family of flies (Diptera) with larvae that are parasitoids of other insects. He was perhaps the most prolific publisher of new tachinids, naming and describing some 3000 species and genera. He made important contributions to the biological control of insect pests and he was the first to identify the insect vector of a debilitating disease in Peru. Townsend was also a controversial figure and criticism of his approach to insect taxonomy continues to this day.

== Biography ==
Townsend was born in Oberlin, Ohio, in 1863. He attended high school in Constantine, Michigan, and graduated in 1882. From 1887 to 1891, he studied medicine at Columbian University (now George Washington University) in Washington, D.C. At the same time he worked in the United States Department of Agriculture as an assistant entomologist for Charles V. Riley.

During his long career, Townsend held a number of positions. In 1891 he joined the faculty at the New Mexico College of Agriculture in Las Cruces, teaching zoology and entomology. In addition to teaching, he collected and studied local insects, especially those that had the potential to become agricultural pests. He made notes on 400 insect species in New Mexico and authored 90 publications.

In 1892, Townsend traded positions with a friend and fellow entomologist, T.D.A. Cockerell, and became curator of the Public Museum in Kingston, Jamaica. Townsend focused on educating the local farmers about insect pests and how to control them. In 1894 he was rehired by the USDA to study the appearance of a new pest, the cotton boll weevil in Texas and northern Mexico. He quickly determined the seriousness of the threat and made recommendations for controlling the outbreak. In 1896 the USDA sent him to tropical Mexico to continue his research on the boll weevil and search for predators or parasites that might provide biological control. He was unsuccessful in finding effective biological control agents but he did succeed in collecting a wide array of flies for his own studies.

Upon his return from Mexico in 1899 he settled with his family in El Paso, Texas. Townsend and a partner started their own business, the Townsend-Barber Taxidermy and Zoological Company. Townsend acted as a field guide for the company, leading scientific and hunting expeditions into the Sierra Madre of northern Mexico. In 1903 he wrote an article for Field & Stream extolling the hunting opportunities in the region.

After the death of his wife Caroline in 1903, Townsend left his children with relatives and taught biology for two years at the Batangas Provincial School in the Philippines. This appears to be the one time in his career that he did not actively collect flies or publish entomological papers. In 1906, he returned to the United States and was hired again at the USDA by L. O. Howard, the chief of the Bureau of Entomology. Townsend worked at a lab in Melrose Highlands, Massachusetts, studying potential parasites of the gypsy moth. While in Melrose Highlands, Townsend also remarried and completed his bachelor's degree from Columbia College.

In 1909, Townsend was appointed entomologist and director of the Experiment Station in Piura, Peru. He was sent there to assess the insect pests that were damaging the country's cotton crops. He identified the cotton square-weevil as the major culprit and found an effective biological control for the pest. After this success he turned his attention to uncovering the vector for verruga peruana and Oroya fever, diseases endemic to the mountains of Peru that were responsible for thousands of deaths. Townsend eventually identified a sandfly, Lutzomyia verracarum, as the disease vector.

Townsend returned to the U.S. in 1914 and was employed by the USDA as a specialist on parasitic flies and curator of the Diptera collection at the U.S. National Museum. He also completed his dissertation on the reproductive organs of the female fly and was awarded a doctorate degree by George Washington University. His success and recognition were cut short by a bitter controversy with his colleagues. Townsend was a notorious "splitter" of genera, describing hundreds of genera containing only a single species. Many entomologists disagreed with his approach to fly taxonomy and Townsend responded with scathing personal attacks against his critics. Finally, in 1919 when one of his critics, John M. Aldrich, was appointed chief of the Bureau of Entomology, Townsend decided to resign his position and leave the United States for good.

Townsend and his family moved to Brazil, where he bought property in Itaquaquecetuba, including a large adobe house built in the 1600s by Jesuits. He was hired by the state government to investigate agricultural pests and recommend methods for control. In 1923 he returned to Peru and became director of the Institute of Agriculture and Parasitology in Lima. During this time he also traveled the breadth of South America following the Amazon River from the Atlantic to the Andes and then up and over the mountains to the Pacific Ocean. He wrote about his adventures in a series of travelogues published in by a travel magazine in Buenos Aires.

He returned to Brazil in 1929 and took a job as an entomologist at Fordlandia, an industrial community established by Henry Ford to manage a huge rubber plantation and ensure a steady supply of rubber for the U.S. automobile industry. Townsend quit Fordlandia in 1935 but two of his sons continued to work there as entomologists for a number of years.

Between 1934 and 1942, Townsend published his magnum opus on the muscoid flies, Manual of Myiology, consisting of 3760 pages in twelve parts with complete keys for the muscoid genera and extensive notes on biology and morphology. The last two volumes are an unexpected digression from entomology, containing his ideas on the origin of the Moon, the development of humans, and the nature of gravity.

Two years after completing the publication of his major work, Townsend died quietly at his home in Itaquaquecetuba on 17 March 1944.

Despite his contributions and acknowledged expertise, Townsend remains a controversial figure, criticized for his approach to tachinid taxonomy. Entomologist James O'Hara has called him "the most eccentric and prolific of all tachinidologists" who "has, in some ways, done more to retard tachinid taxonomy than advance it."

== Taxon described by him ==
- See Category:Taxa named by Charles Henry Tyler Townsend
