= Alberto Barton =

Peruvian microbiologist (1870–1950)

Alberto Barton Thompson
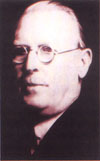
- Alberto Barton Thompson
- Born: August 12, 1870; Buenos Aires, Argentina
- Died: October 25, 1950 (aged 80); Lima, Peru
- Education: Universidad Nacional Mayor de San Marcos
- Known for: Carrion's disease, Oroya fever, Bartonellosis, Bartonella bacilliformis
- Scientific career
- Fields: MedicineMicrobiology

Alberto Barton (1870–1950) was an Argentine-born Peruvian microbiologist who discovered the etiologic agent of Carrion's disease or Oroya fever. The bacteria was named Bartonella bacilliformis, in his honor. It is the type species of the genus Bartonella, and family Bartonellaceae.

== Youth and education ==
Alberto Leonardo Barton Thompson was the fourth of nine brothers. His father was a Uruguayan chemist, Ralph John Barton Wild born in Montevideo, Uruguay, 24 December 1834, and his mother Anastasia Francisca Augusta del Sagrado Corazón de Jesús Thompson, born in Buenos Aires, 25 December 1843, both of English descent. The whole family emigrated to Peru in 1874.

Alberto Barton did his primary studies in "Nuestra Señora de la O de Lima" and high school at "Convictorio Peruano en Lima." He was admitted to San Marcos University and graduated from its medical school in 1900.

He received a grant for training in tropical diseases and bacteriology in Edinburgh and at the London School of Tropical Medicine. He came back to Lima and was working as Chief Physician of the Department of Medicine of San Jorge of the Laboratory Department of Guadalupe Hospital. This was where he began his first research activities.

== Bartonella ==
The discovery of Bartonella was made in 1905. There was an outbreak among foreign workers who traveled to La Oroya to participate in the construction of the Oroya–Lima railway. Most of the workers were transferred to Guadalupe Hospital and died of an unknown disease characterized by fever and severe anemia.

Fourteen patients with anemia and fever were studied by Barton. He discovered bacillus within their red blood cells. If the patients recovered from the acute phase, the bacillus changed shape to cocci; and if the patients developed characteristic skin lesions—hemangioma-like nodules in the skin and mucous membranes—the so-called "Verruga peruana", the bacteria disappeared from the peripheral blood.

On October 5, 1905, during a scientific meeting, he announced his discovery.

The first manuscript was published in 1909 in the journal Crónica Médica. In 1913, Richard P. Strong of Harvard University arrived in Peru to study the tropical diseases in South America. Strong confirmed Barton's discovery and named the bacteria Bartonia in honor of Barton; the bacterial species was subsequently named Bartonella bacilliformis.

Barton also studied Paragonimiasis, Leishmaniasis, and Brucellosis. He had a daughter named Dora.

== Awards ==
He was decorated with the "Orden del Sol de la Nación" in Peru for his research and was elected President of the National Academy of Medicine. Subsequently, he was the first Doctor Honoris Causa of San Marcos University in 1925.

He died on October 25, 1950, at the age of 80.
