= Evelyn Butler Tilden =

American microbiologist

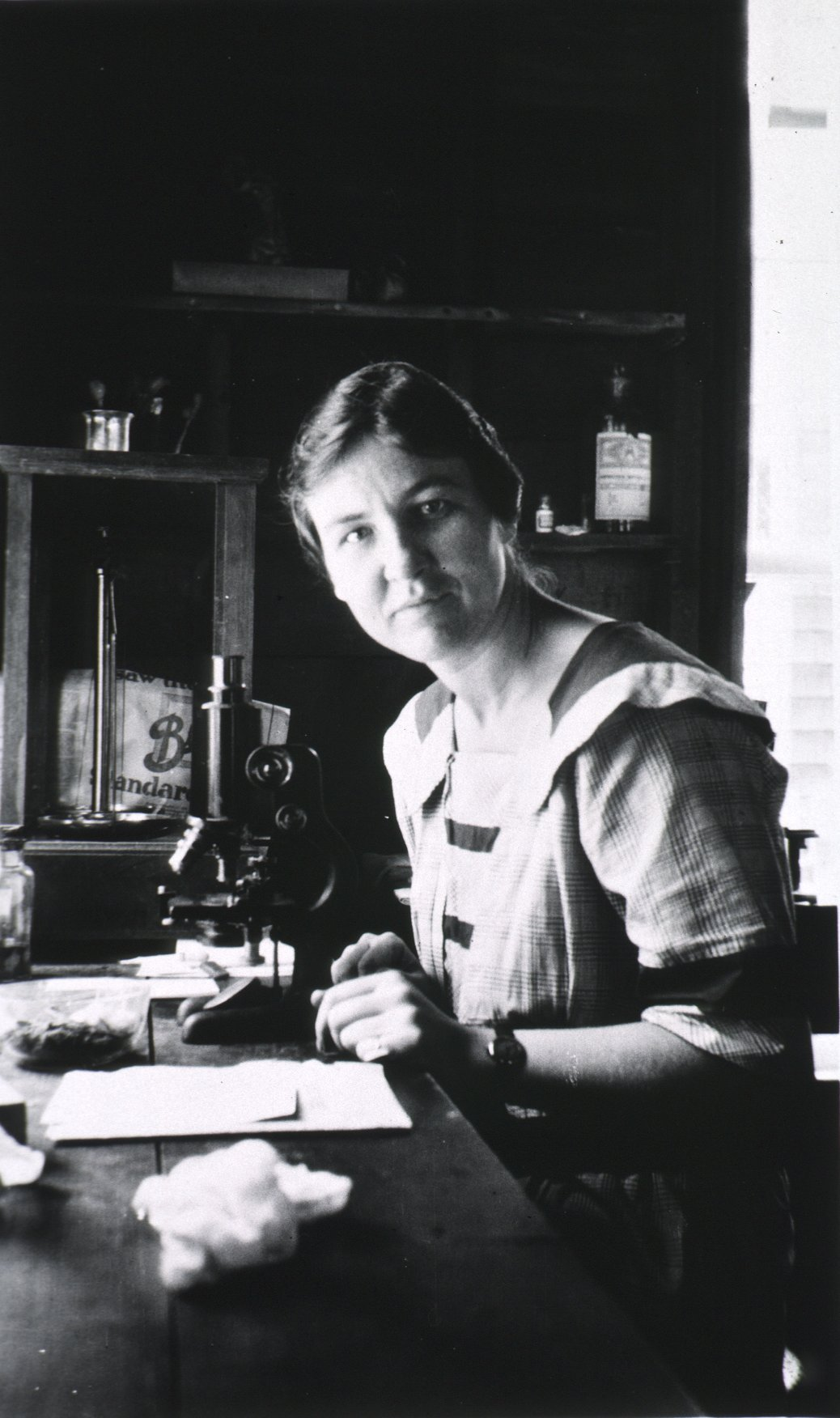
- Born: March 28, 1891; Lawrence, Massachusetts, US
- Died: 1983
- Education: Brown University; Columbia University
- Scientific career
- Fields: Microbiology
- Workplaces: National Institutes of Health; Northwestern University; Brookfield Zoo
- Thesis: The Response of the Monkey (Macacus rhesus) to Withdrawal of Vitamin A from the Diet (1929)

Evelyn Butler Tilden (March 28, 1891 – 1983) was an American microbiologist who researched carbohydrates and bacteria in saliva at National Institutes of Health and Northwestern University Dental School. She later served as head of laboratories at Brookfield Zoo.

== Early life and education ==
Tilden was born March 28, 1891, in Lawrence, Massachusetts to Harriette (née Butler) and Howard Benjamin Tilden. She completed an A.B. at Brown University in 1913. While working with Hideyo Noguchi at the Rockefeller Institute for Medical Research as his editor, she quickly also became a laboratory technician in his lab and developed a staining technique for the routine diagnosis of syphilis in 1922. Tilden worked with Noguchi on trachoma, finding that Bacterium granulosis (a Gram negative bacterium thought by Noguchi to be the cause of trachoma) was still a potent infector after a year or more of dormancy. When Noguchi died in 1928, Tilden helped finish his work showing that oroya fever and verruga peruviana are the same disease. While in Noguchi's laboratory, she earned a M.S. (1926) and Ph.D. (1929) at Columbia University. Her dissertation, coauthored with Edgar G. Miller Jr., was titled, The Response of the Monkey (Macacus rhesus) to Withdrawal of Vitamin A from the Diet. She was an assistant in bacteriology and immunology from 1928 to 1931 at Roosevelt. Tilden was a member of Sigma Xi and Sigma Delta Epsilon.

== Career ==
Tilden taught at Colorado State University from 1931 to 1932 as an assistant professor. She was a research associate from 1932 to 1937 in the department of research bacteriology at Northwestern University Medical School. Tilden joined the NIH division of chemistry as a microbiologist in 1937, discovering how to prepare rare sugars from avocados for carbohydrate research. In 1942, she joined the department of microbiology at Northwestern University Dental School as an associate professor from until 1948 when she was promoted to full professor. Tilden served as chairperson from 1942 to 1954. She was funded by NIH for work on bacteria in saliva. In 1948, Tilden published the book, Outline of Bacteriology.

From 1954 to 1963, Tilden was curator of laboratories at Brookfield Zoo and the animal hospital where she remained as emeritus after her retirement. At the zoo, Tilden continued her microbiological research and discovered a cure for fungal disease in captive penguins.

Tilden was a member of the American Society for Microbiology. She died in 1983.
