= Hideyo Noguchi =

Japanese bacteriologist (1876–1928)

- 野口 英世
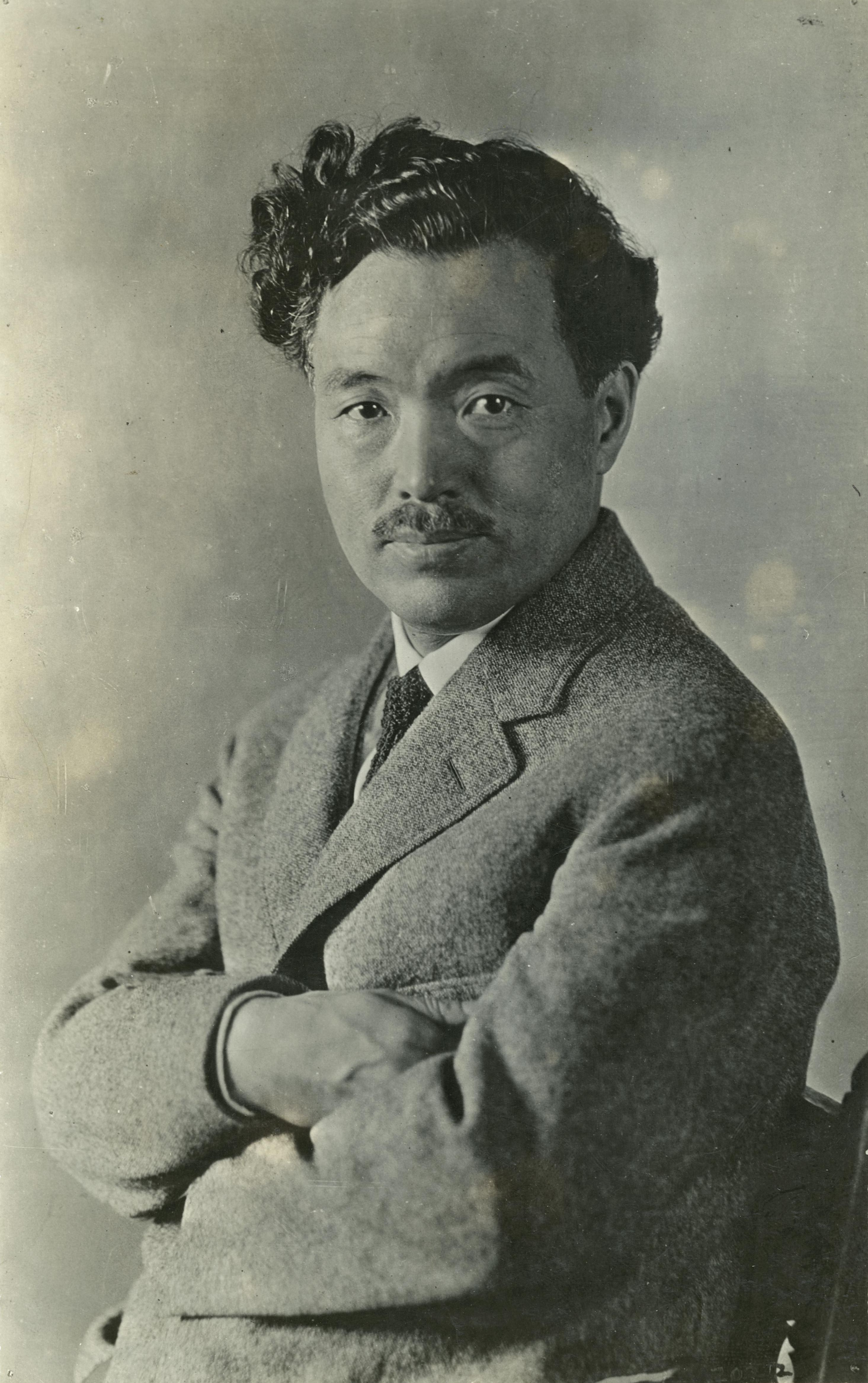
- Born: November 9, 1876; Inawashiro, Fukushima, Japan
- Died: May 21, 1928 (aged 51); Accra, Gold Coast
- Resting place: Woodlawn Cemetery, New York City, US
- Known for: Syphilis; Treponema pallidum, Neurosyphilis
- Spouse: Mary Loretta Dardis (m. 1912)
- Awards: Imperial Prize of the Japan Academy, Order of the Rising Sun, Kober Medal, Order of Dannebrog, Legion of Honour
- Scientific career
- Fields: Bacteriology, Serology, Immunology
- Workplaces: Rockefeller Institute for Medical Research, University of Pennsylvania

Japanese name
- Kanji: 野口 英世
- Hiragana: のぐち ひでよ
Transcriptions
- Romanization: Noguchi Hideyo

Hideyo Noguchi (野口 英世, Noguchi Hideyo; November 9, 1876 – May 21, 1928), also known as Seisaku Noguchi (野口 清作, Noguchi Seisaku), was a Japanese bacteriologist at the Rockefeller Institute during its foundation under Simon Flexner and known for his work on syphilis and contributing to the long term understanding of neurosyphilis.

During the emergence of the field of serology, he began as a research assistant to American physician Silas Weir Mitchell in his studies on snake venom at the University of Pennsylvania in 1901. Mitchell and Noguchi presented the results before National Academy of Science.

Noguchi was an early advocate of the widespread use of antivenoms before their mass production in the United States. In 1903, Noguchi went to the Statens Serum Institute in Denmark and produced one of the first antiserums to treat the North American rattlesnake bite alongside Thorvald Madsen.

In 1909, he wrote his comprehensive monograph, Snake Venoms: An Investigation of Venomous Snakes with Special Reference to the Phenomena of Their Venoms, which contained several drawings and photographs of specimens.

Beginning his career at the Rockefeller Institute during its foundation, Noguchi was the first person in the United States to confirm the causative agent of syphilis, Treponema pallidum, after it was first identified by Fritz Schaudinn and Erich Hoffmann in 1905. His most notable achievement was isolating Treponema pallidum in the brain tissues of patients with general paresis and tabes dorsals, a late stage consequence of tertiary syphilis. His discovery established the conclusive link between the physical and mental manifestation of syphilis. American educator and psychiatrist John Clare Whitehorn considered it an outstanding psychiatric achievement.

Later in his career, Noguchi developed the first serum to give partial immunity to Rocky Mountain spotted fever, a notoriously lethal disease before treatment was discovered. He also suggested the name for the genus Leptospira in 1917.

However, he became increasingly erratic and inaccurate. His autopsy by William Alexander Young found a syphilitic heart. He misidentified yellow fever as being caused by the bacteria, Leptospira icterohemorrhagiae, and received scrutiny when it was later understood to be a virus with the invention of a electron microscope. Prior to this scrutiny, Noguchi died of the disease in Accra, Gold Coast during an expedition to Africa in search for its cause.

Posthumously, his work on yellow fever was overturned alongside his claims of discovering the causative agent of rabies, poliomyelitis and trachoma, and his culture of syphilis could not be reproduced. His research with his colleague Evelyn Tilden after his death confirmed that Carrion's disease and verruca peruana were caused by the same species of bacteria.

Noguchi was one of the first Japanese scientists to gain international acclaim outside of Japan for his scientific contributions. In addition, he was nominated several times for a Nobel prize in medicine between 1913 and 1927, often bringing more attention to neglected tropical diseases.

His name is attached to the spirochete, Leptospira noguchii. In 2004, Noguchi's face was featured on the 1000 yen note. The Hideyo Noguchi Africa Prize is given in his honor.

== Early life ==
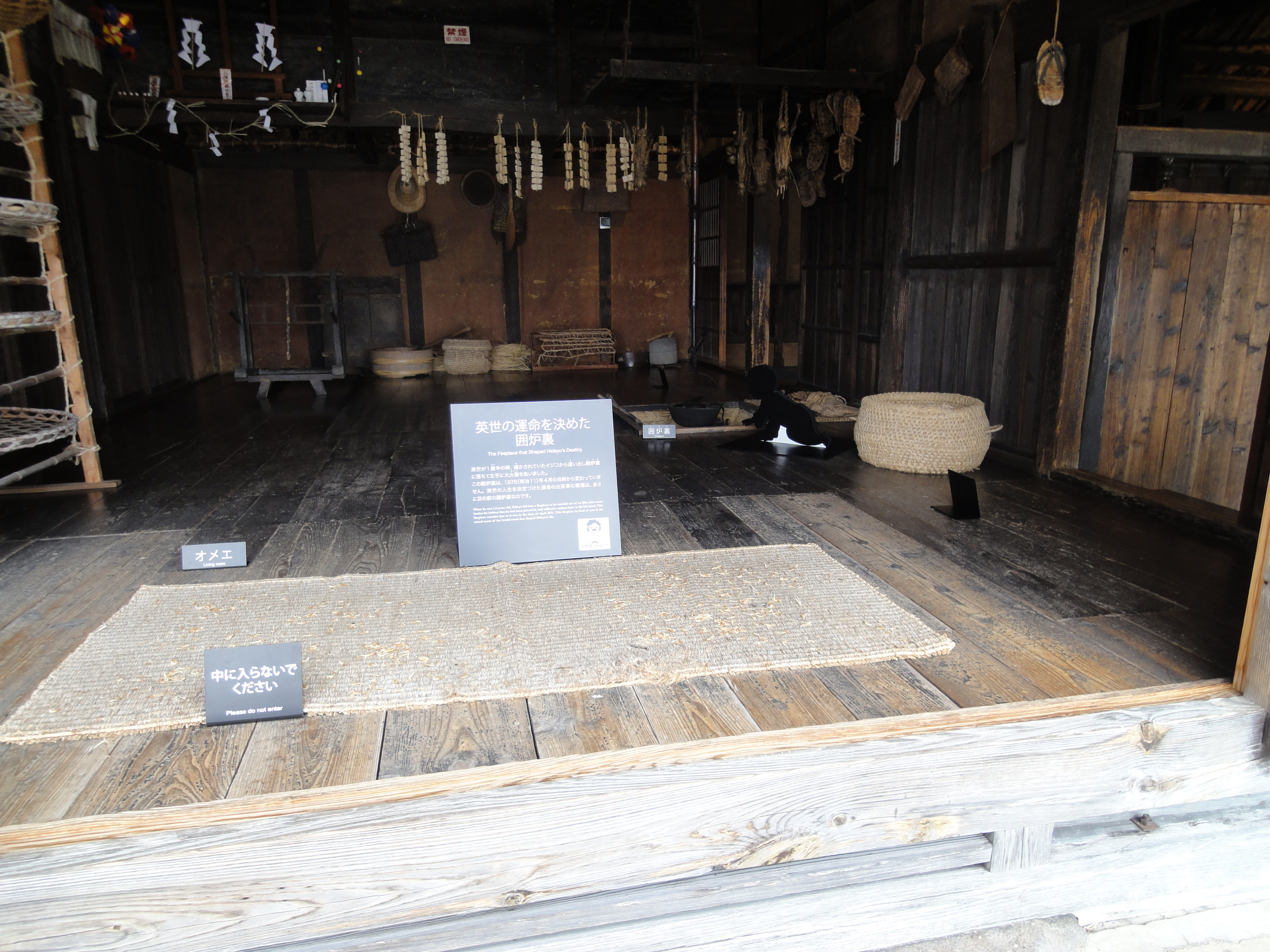
Hideyo Noguchi's childhood home and fireplace

Noguchi was born Seisaku Noguchi in the town of Inawashiro in Fukushima Prefecture in 1876 to an impoverished farming family. His mother Shika worked to maintain the family farm and restore the Noguchi name to the honor it once had, the family having been descended from samurai in the days of Noguchi's great grandfather.

=== Childhood accident ===
Noguchi was two years old when he was left with his deaf grandmother who had poor eyesight alongside his four year old sister, Inu, while his mother worked in the rice fields. He fell into an irori and suffered burns and developed an infection on his left hand.

Since there were no doctor in Inawashiro, his left hand was unable to receive medical attention and remained useless as the upper joints of the fingers were gone, and the remaining joints had adhered to each other to form a solid clump. His thumb was drawn down to his wrist and had become attached to it. While Seisaku could no longer become a successful farmer. Shika promised to give her son an education.

=== Early education ===
In 1883, Noguchi entered Mitsuwa elementary school. His elementary school teacher Kobayashi saw his talent and due to generous contributions from his teacher, Noguchi received surgery for his left hand fifteen years after the accident. Dr. Kanae Watanabe (渡部 鼎, Watanabe Kanae) was the surgeon that operated on Noguchi's hand at his clinic in Aizuwakamatsu.

Noguchi recovered some functionality of his left hand. Afterwards, Noguchi decided to become a doctor. In 1893, sixteen year old Noguchi apprenticed with the same clinic as the doctor who had performed his surgery.

Japan was undergoing a modernization of its medical system during the Meiji Restoration. In 1872, Japan introduced medical examination for doctors, a costly and time consuming process. Although graduates of the Imperial University, an exclusive and elite college, in Tokyo were exempt from the examinations.

Noguchi was not able to get into the Imperial University because of his peasant class. In 1896, he left for Tokyo to receive formal training and prepare for his examination. After one month, Noguchi passed his written portion, and subsequently passed the clinical examinations at twenty years old. He worked at the port of Yokohama as a quarantine officer, earning 35 yen a month.

During this period, he indulged in brothels and wine. In 1898, Noguchi changed his first name to Hideyo after reading a novel by Japanese author Tsubouchi Shōyō about a college student whose character had the same name as him. The character in the story, Seisaku, was an intelligent medical student but became lazy and ruined his life.

Noguchi received a position at the Kitasato Research. Although, he was an outsider as one of the few doctors to have not graduated from the Imperial University.

=== Noguchi's patrons ===
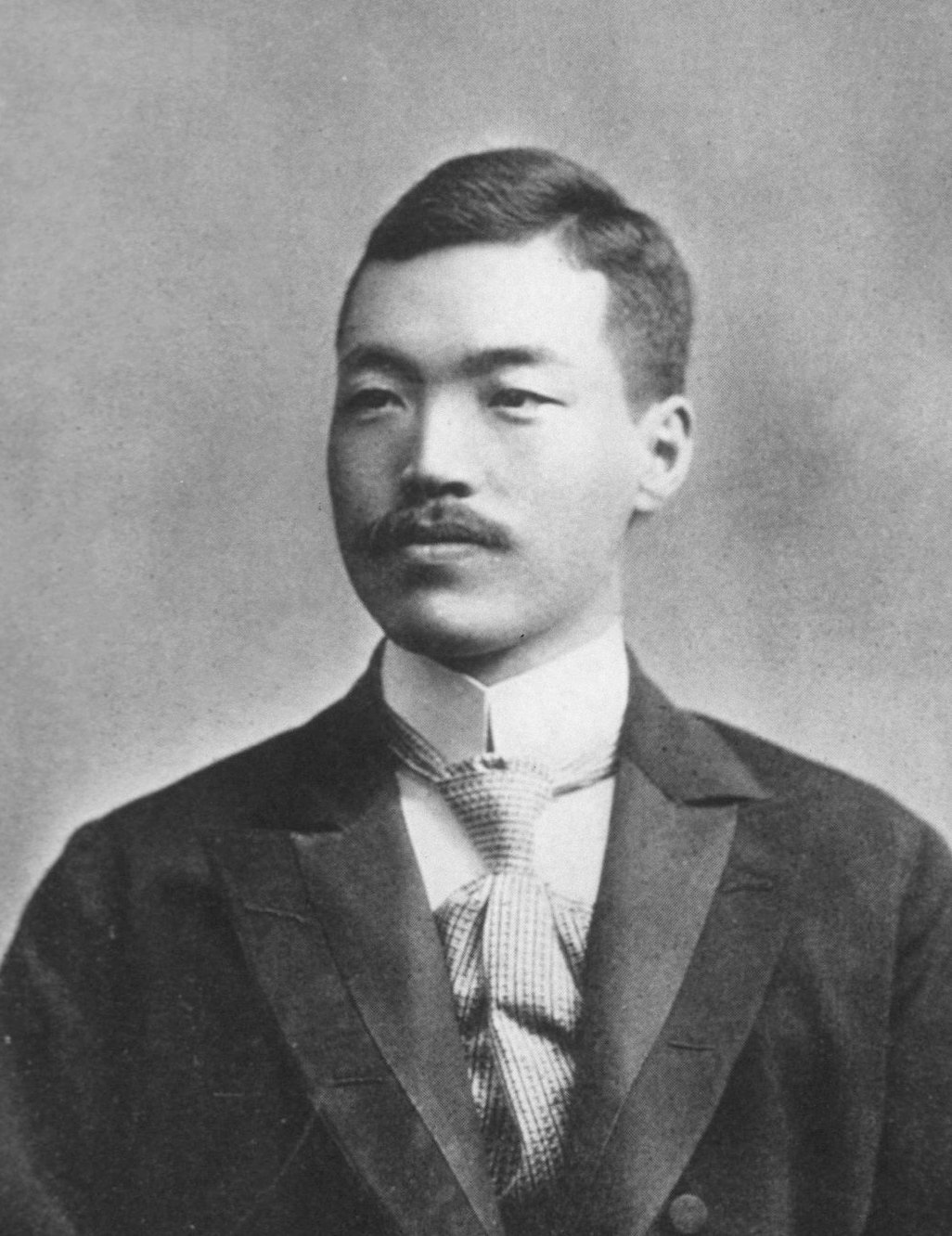
Young Hideyo Noguchi

Dr. Watanabe introduced Noguchi to Chiwaki Morinosuke founder of the Takayama Dental College (precursor to the Tokyo Dental College) who made him an apprentice. Both Noguchi and Morinosuke became close friend. Morinosuke felt Noguchi showed great talent.

Noguchi's main benefactors were, Sakae Kobayashi, his elementary school teacher and father figure, Kanae Watanabe, the doctor who performed surgery on his hand, and Morinosuke Chiwaki, who helped fund his travel to the United States.

=== Leaving Japan ===
Noguchi was inspired to go to the United States, partly motivated by difficulties in obtaining a medical position in Japan as it required expensive schooling. He experienced discrimination as employers were concerned his hand deformity would discourage patients.

In 1899, Noguchi met Simon Flexner during his internship as his translator, being one of a few people who spoke English and Japanese at the Kitasato Institute. Flexner, who was visiting to see research being made on dysentery from foreign scientists, gave polite words of encouragement to his desire to work in the United States.

Noguchi decided that was that and bought a ticket on the America Maru. Chiwaki took a loan to pay for it. Noguchi hosted a party to celebrate, spending most of his money before leaving.

== Early career ==
On December 30, 1900, Noguchi arrived in Philadelphia. He surprised Flexner at his position at the University of Pennsylvania. In spite of their brief encounter, Noguchi requested a position but he said the university had no funds. Although, Flexner did want to hire an assistant to investigate snake venoms.

Later in Flexner's diary, he recognized his courage and persistence for traveling so far from his home country. The day after he arrived, Flexner asked, "Have you ever studied snake venom?" While not having much experience, but an abundance of determination, he said, "Yes, sir, I do know a little about it, but I'd like the chance to learn more."

=== Research at University of Pennsylvania ===
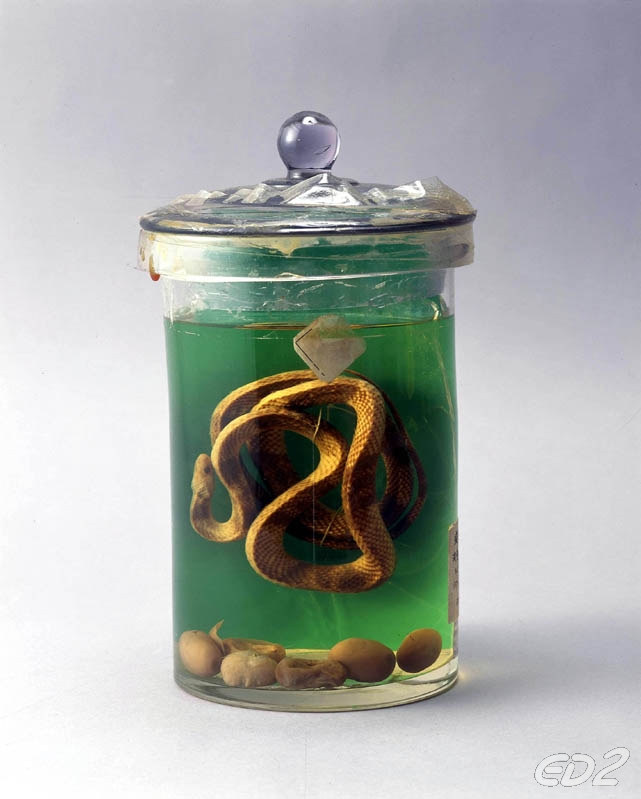
Specimens prepared by Hideyo Noguchi

On January 4, 1901, Noguchi started his research position, earning eight dollars a month, coming straight out of Flexner's pocket. Flexner left for San Francisco to investigate an outbreak of the plague, leaving Noguchi for three months under the guidance of Dr. Silas Weir Mitchell. Despite his lack of knowledge, Flexner returned to find he had written a 250 pages on snake venom. Flexner was impressed. In addition, Mitchell and Noguchi wrote a joint research paper, which was his first official publication. Both presented their scientific findings before the National Academy of Science in Philadelphia, one of the greatest honors an American scientist could have at the time. Dr. Mitchell spoke during the presentation but Noguchi handled the specimens.

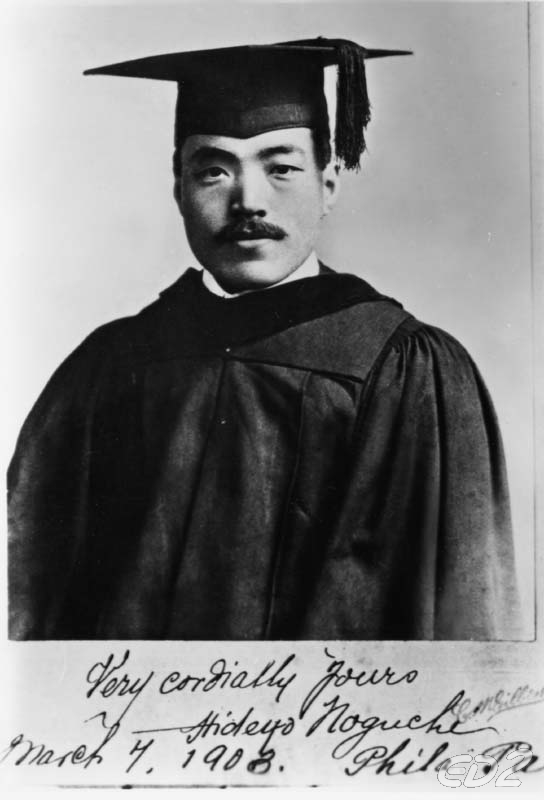
Hideyo Noguchi getting honorary degre

Dr. Mitchell said after their research concluded...

"It is thanks to the great efforts of this young man that I have been able to bring my thirty years of research to their final conclusion."

Although, Dr. Mitchell was concerned about his acceptance into larger Western society. During his research on snakes, Noguchi complained about live rabbits being fed to snakes in cages and felt the practice cruel, but colleagues said he was too sensitive. Nonetheless, Mitchell recommended him for the Carnegie Fellowship. Noguchi was accepted and became an official researcher and received funding from both the Carnegie Institute and National Academy of Science. Paul Ehrlich wrote to congratulate him. On July 9, 1907, the University of Pennsylvania awarded Hideyo Noguchi an honorary degree. On July 19, 1907, he wrote to about the accomplishment,

"Everything is beautiful when it is still in a dream state, but when it becomes a reality it is no longer interesting to me... When one wish comes true, another is born... Now I intend to request a medical degree from the Japanese government."

=== State institute and advocate for antivenom ===
French scientist Albert Calmette was the first to produce an antitoxin for venomous snake bites in 1895. Mitchell had made attempts to produce a serum for rattlesnakes, but was unsuccessful and encouraged his protege. Subsequently, Noguchi received an invitation to research at the Statens Serum Institute in Copenhagen. He wrote several papers with fellow bacteriologist, Thorvald Madsen. Noguchi brought a hundred grams of dried rattlesnake venom to Copenhagen and with Madsen produced one of the first antiserums to treat North American rattlesnake bites in 1903. Noguchi was the first to propose the mass production of antivenom in the USA, but not having been realized until Afrânio do Amaral from the Butantan Institute and his research contributed to the development of the first North American rattlesnake antivenom in 1927.

=== Major publications ===
Between 1905 and 1908, Noguchi produced 28 papers and reports on his work with snake venoms and the routine observations of immunologic relationships, as well as tetanus. In 1907, he wrote the chapter on venoms in William Osler and Thomas McCraes Modern Medicine.

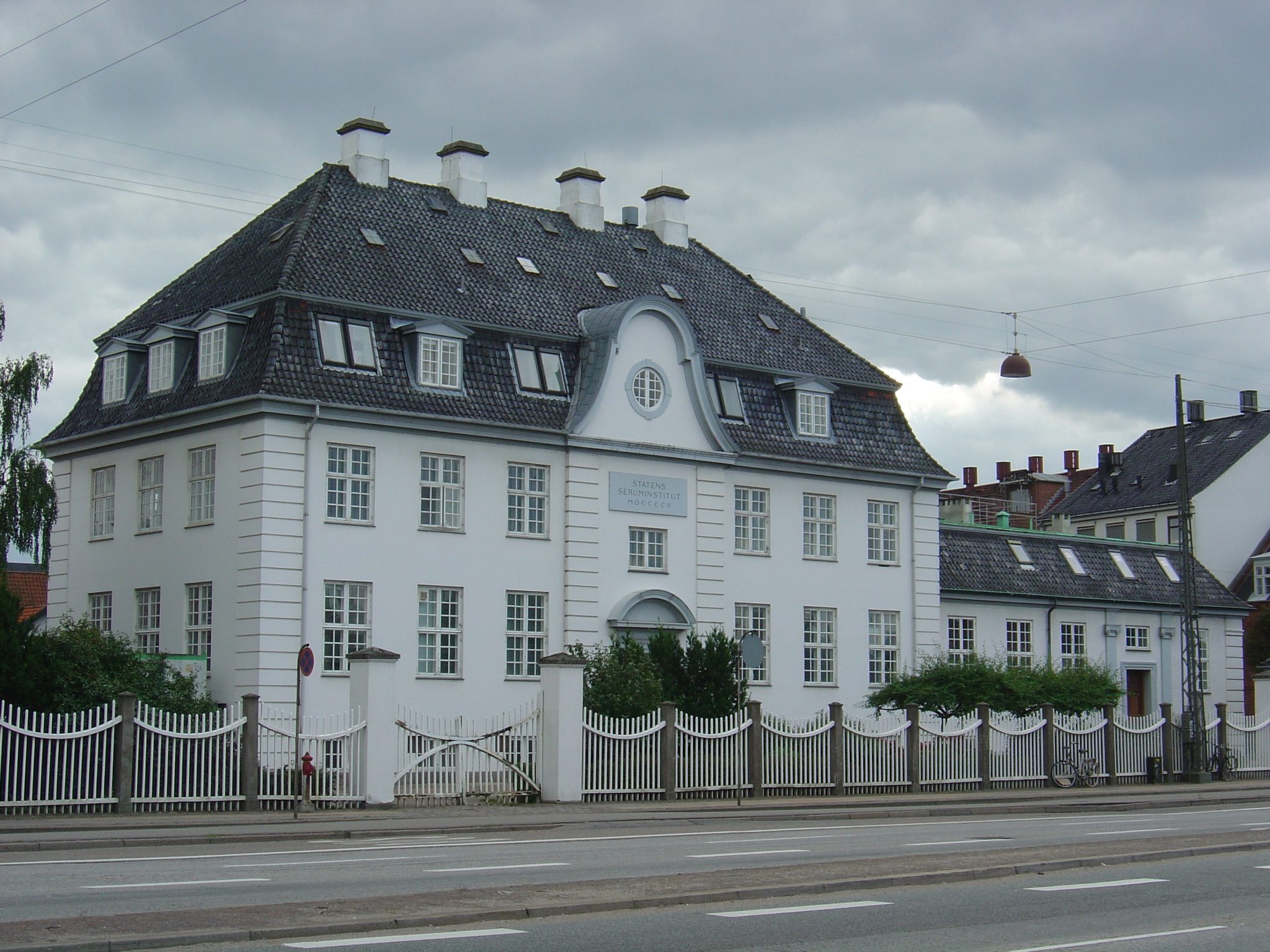
Statens Serum Institute in Copenhagen

In 1909, Noguchi released a comprehensive monograph on snake venom, Snake Venoms: An Investigation of Venomous Snakes with Special Reference to the Phenomena of Their Venoms. The publication contained drawings and several photographs of specimens. In the preface, it stated,

“No single work in the English language exists at this time which treats of the facts of zoological, anatomical, physiological, and pathological features of venomous snakes, with particular reference to the properties of their venoms."

In 1904, he returned from Copenhagen. Flexner had offered him a position at the Rockefeller Institute alongside six others members. Noguchi moved to Lexington Avenue in New York City. He was introduced to another medical student Norio Araki, who was roommates with Hideyo Noguchi for three years.

== Career at the Rockefeller Institute ==
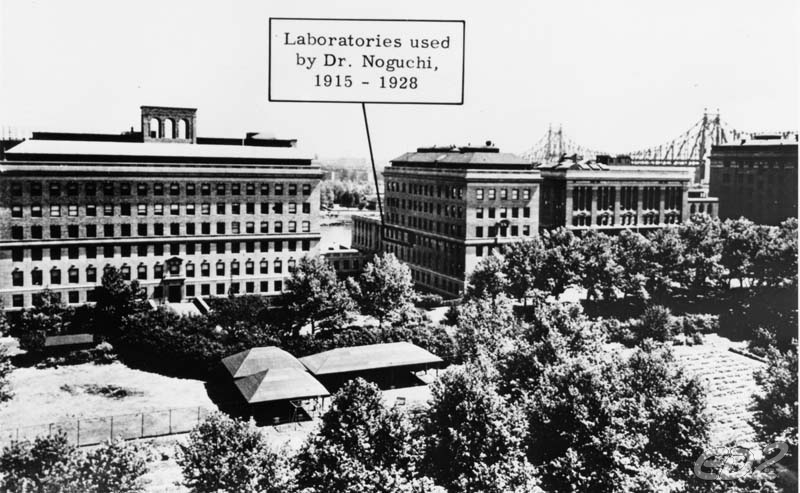
Hideyo Noguchi's laboratory at Rockefeller Institute

In 1905, Treponema pallidum was first identified as the cause of syphilis by Fritz Schaudinn and Erich Hoffmann. Flexner put Noguchi onto syphilis research as he selected syphilis as one of the major diseases to focus research on at the institute.

In 1906, Noguchi was the first person in the United States to confirm the spirochete sixty days after its discovery. Between 1906 to 1915, Noguchi made some of his most long lasting discoveries and scientific contributions to syphilis.

Regarding the genus of Leptospira, which was first observed by A. M. Stimson in 1907 in kidney tissue slices of a victim. Stimson identifying the species L. interrogans. Noguchi conducted a study to find whether if jaundice, specifically in the context of Weil's disease, which often spreads through the urine of the infected rats, is found in the bodies of American rats as it does in European rats. During his research, Noguchi notices the spirochete is unlike previous he has encountered. In 1917, he suggests the name of the new genus Leptospira meaning slim spiral.

=== Butyric acid test ===
When the Wasserman test was announced in 1906, Noguchi began working on refining it as it utilized serum reactions, which he was familiar from the course of his research of snake venom.

Noguchi and J. W. Moore created the butyric acid test for diagnosing syphilis, which used fluid from the spinal column, it was considered valuable tool in the early days of syphilis diagnosis. Physicians reported finding the test more sensitive. During the distribution to hospitals, doctors reported, “Noguchi had prepared for us all the antigen and ambocepter tests that we used. He also spent about two weeks at our laboratory and helped us materially by making many of the tests."

In particular, it was effective at diagnosing neurosyphilis as it detected 90 percent of cases of general paralysis. Although, the test was used less as more refined tests were developed and it was technically demanding and required more specialized expertise.

In 1909, he published twelve papers on syphilis. In 1910, Noguchi published his manuscript, Serum Diagnosis of Syphilis, his most popular publication, assisting doctors and physicians in the diagnosis and treatment of syphilis.

=== Controversial pure culture of syphilis ===
Dr. Flexner told him to focus his efforts on obtaining a pure culture of the spirochete. Flexner wrote in his diary, “Once he was started on a problem he would pursue it to the bitter end." Noguchi set up hundreds of tubes for his cultures and used thousands of microscopic slides in his lab.

In February 1911, Noguchi believed that he had grown a pure culture and wrote to his childhood mentor Kobayashi, “I feel as if I am dancing in heaven." He thought it might eradicate of syphilis. Although few were able to reproduce his results and his pure culture was considered unreproducible. In 1934, Hans Zinsser, a personal friend of Noguchi, reluctantly said it had not been successful. It was prone to contamination. Over the next century, bacteriologists and researchers continued struggled to produce a stable culture.

=== Presence of Treponema pallidum in paresis ===
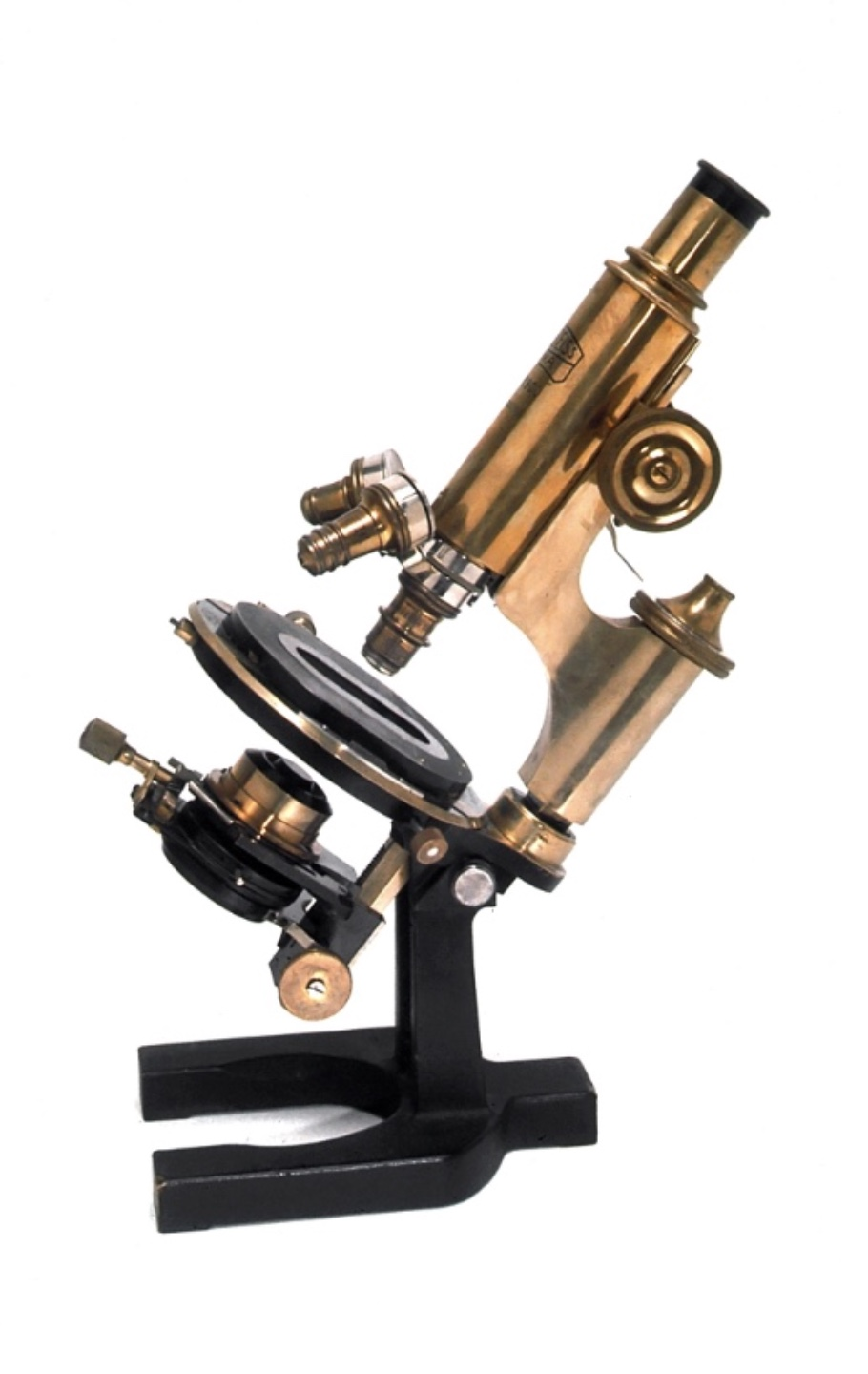
Hideyo Noguchi's personal microscope used to identify syphilis

Wards Island State Hospital, located on an island in the East River, held the New York State Pathologic Institute and was located opposite of the Rockefeller Institute. Staff members at the Rockefeller Institute, Phoebus Levene and James B. Murphy worked at the Pathologic Institute and were well aware of the issue of paresis and brought this up in conversation with Hideyo Noguchi.

When left untreated between 1911 and 1918 87% of patients suffering from neurosyphilis died and 9% improved with 3.5% seen as remissions. Some researchers held out some hope that understanding the pathophysiology of paresis could lead to a cure for late stage neurosyphilis.

Noguchi decided to remove the doubt and demonstrate the presence of caustive agent in paretic brains. He began collecting samples from spinal cords and brains of paretic patients to determine its relationship to syphilis.

In 1912, Noguchi had collected a total of 200 brains and 12 spinal cords samples from patients in collaboration with J. W. Moore, a psychiatrist at Wards Island. Eventually, he discovered the presence of Treponema pallidum in the spinal cord of a patient. Consequently, this discovery proved the homogeneity of a mental and physical disease and demonstrated that an organic agent could cause psychosis. Noguchi visited his friend and neighbor, Ichiro Hori, after his discovery. His friend reported that he bursted in the middle of the night, dancing and wearing nothing but his underwear, shouting, “I found it! I found it!"

With this discovery, Noguchi's influence went beyond bacteriology. John C. Whiteborn wrote about the history of American psychiatry.

“In the organicist tradition, the outstanding psychiatric achievement as well as the final and conclusive link in the demonstration of the etiologic role of syphilis in general paresis was Noguchi and Moore’s demonstration of the spirochete in the brains of general paretics."

Before his discovery, about 20 percent of the New York State mental hospitals were patients suffering from paresis that led to a patient’s death within five to seven years. Noguchi allowed for these patients to be diagnosed with syphilis. Noguchi proved that general paresis and tabes dorsalis are late stages of tertiary syphilis of the brain and spinal cords. Noguchi had discovered the delayed effects that could appear ten to twenty years after infection on the nervous system. In 1925, Association of American Physicians granted him its prized Kober Medal for this discovery.

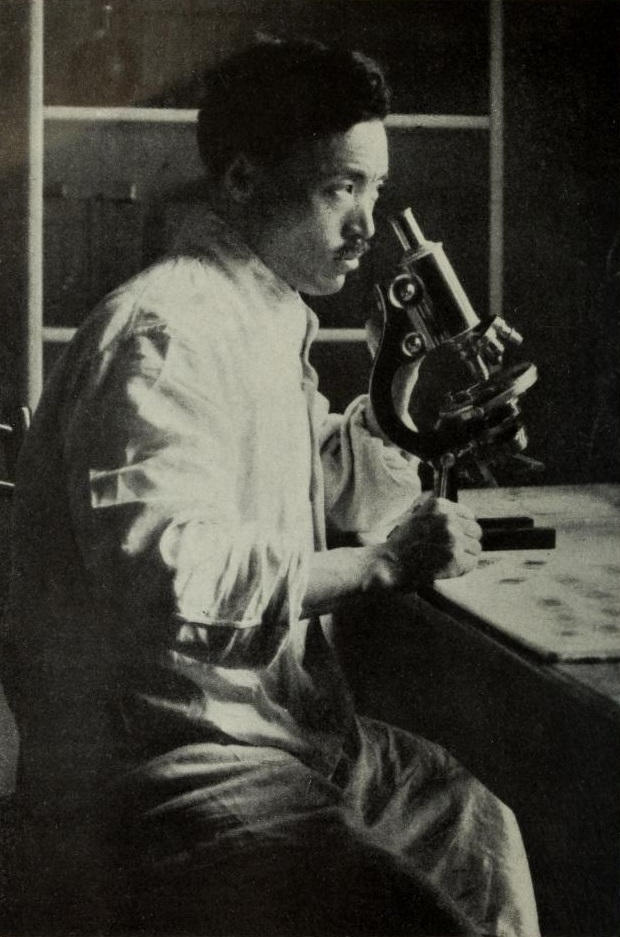
Hideyo Noguchi at work in his laboratory

When interviewed later, Noguchi said,

"All you need is enough test tubes, sufficient money, dedication, and hard work. ... and one more thing, you have got to be able to put up with endless failure."

When compared to a genius, he said, "there was no such thing as genius. There was only the willingness to work three, four, even five times harder than the next man". Dr. Noguchi's name is remembered in the binomial attached to another spirochete, Leptospira noguchii.

=== Unusual research methods ===
Noguchi was prolific in his lab results. Flexner described his work as "superhuman". His record for numbers of published papers in a single year was an unheard of nineteen submitted to journals. Noguchi published over 200 paper and gave lecture tours throughout Europe during his career.

Noguchi rarely read extensively before his experimentation. He wanted to learn through his failure. He report in a letter to his mentor,

"Theories are not to be taught by anybody outside of ourselves. We are the best teachers of the truth — I mean by this that we ought to convince ourselves chiefly by our own experiences and own experiments."

Although, he tended to draw premature conclusions. During a lecture on the transmission of syphilis to rabbits, he had been successful in only one out of thirty-six cases. Noguchi did not label his test tubes, he insisted he had it memorized. He claimed to have a "special method".

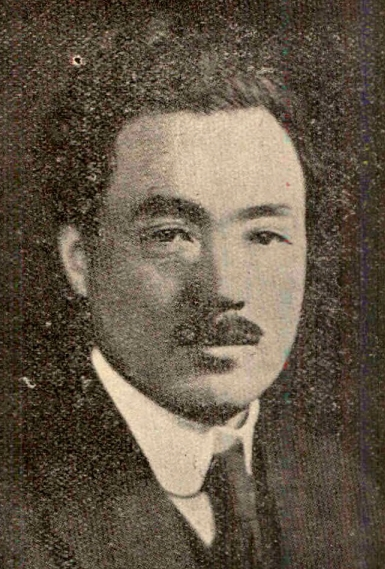
Noguchi in 1928

His work station was covered in cigarette butts. His friend Okumura witnessed Noguchi drank and smoked a great deal, but was stunned at how Noguchi could get along without sleep. He could be irresponsible with his specimens. Once he swallowed solution of jaundice while pipetting a culture. He washed his mouth out with alcohol but he felt he could have contracted jaundice.

Early in his career, Noguchi's found it difficult for him to accept help as he wanted to ensure he received proper credit for his discoveries. Often washed his own test tubes and grounded his own mixtures which research assistants typically do. He once said, "I can't allow someone who doesn't know exactly what I'm doing here to interfere."

When he met Evelyn Tilden, an English major, in Massachusetts, she was hired as his secretary. Tilden was profoundly impactful to the writing of his research papers. Eventually, Tilden became his apprentice and Noguchi encouraged her to enroll in courses in biology and organic chemistry at Columbia University. Eventually, she received a doctoral degree in 1931 and made a career for herself, becoming professor at the North Western University.

== Personal life ==
=== Marriage and relationships ===
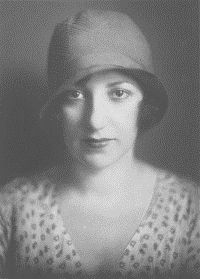
Mrs. Noguchi (Mary Loretta Dardis)

Noguchi secretly married Mary Loretta Dardis on April 10, 1912, whom he met for a single time after he returned from Copenhagen. He did not meet her again for years, "then ran into her on the street, had a rose in his hand, held it up to her." Both came from a background of poverty. Mary, nicknamed Maize, called her husband, Hidey.

The marriage was kept secret from his family, friends, and boss. Flexner opposed his marriage to an American. Flexner felt he should marry someone of Japanese descent. Noguchi worried his marriage would put his promotion at risk because she would have to be added to his pension and the taboo of having an interracial marriage. Their marriage did not become known to the public until his death.

Both of them moved into an apartment at 381 Central Park West. He would turn the kitchen into a laboratory, leaving bacterial specimens in the refrigerator, have microscopes holding germ cultures on the dinner table, and put test tubes in the oven.

Mary would read often to him at his microscope, whether it was old tales, Tolstoy, or Shakespeare. Mary had to endure his long absences on scientific exhibition.

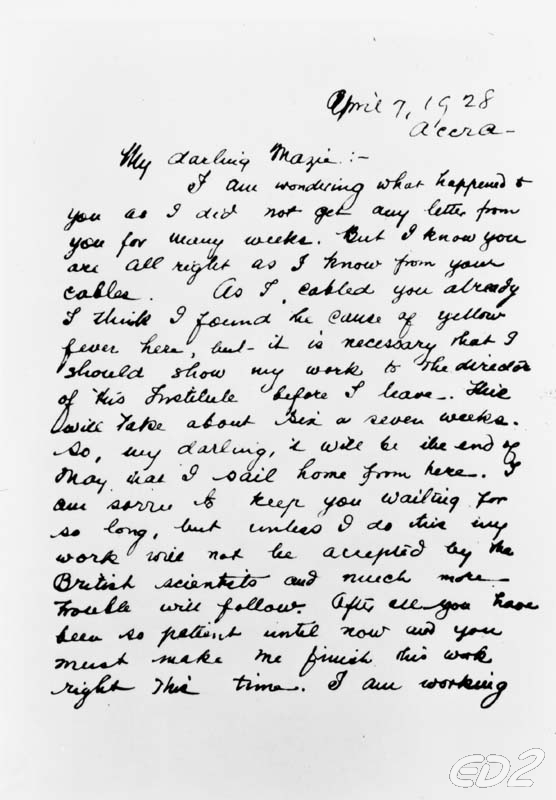
Letter from Hideyo Noguchi to his wife Mary Dardis

Noguchi would often be caught at the laboratory at night and people would ask him why he was not at home? His usual reply was, "Home? This is my home." Some people thought he was escaping from his relationship but it is revealed through letters their marriage brought great satisfaction. Mary provided a refuge and inspiration.

Suzanne Kamata has discussed how American women, such as Mary Dardis, have played a large part in the success of their Japanese husbands but have often gone unnoticed due to their nationality. She states "her assistance may have even helped to prolong his life."

Since he was notoriously bad with money, he often got paid in two separate checks, one to hand on to his wife who paid the bills and the other to keep so that he would have something to spend it on. Mary could have stopped him from entering financial ruin.

Hideyo was close friends with his neighbor, Ichiro Hori, a Japanese painter and photographer. During his studies, Noguchi befriended Hajime Hoshi in the United States.Later Hoshi returned to Japan and started the successful Hoshi Pharmaceutical Co. Hoshi used his friendship with Noguchi and his reputation for his pharmaceutical company, which Hoshi offered to compensate him for. Noguchi said to give it to his family in Inawashiro.

=== Return to Japan ===
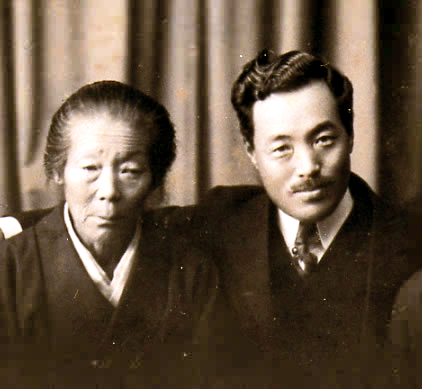
Hideyo Noguchi and his mother Shika

He would write often to his mentor, Kobayashi, who granted him permission to call him "father."

His childhood mentor encouraged Noguchi to return and establish his career in Japan. In 1912, he told his family that he did not plan to return to Japan.

His mother, Shika, who was notably illiterate, wrote, “Please come home soon, please come home soon, please come home soon, please come home soon.” She worked as a midwife but did not have much of an income and his family was at risk of losing the Noguchi home. Noguchi began sending money every month to his family.

His mother's health declined. Noguchi sent an unsubtle telegram to Hoshi and asked for enough money to return home. Hoshi was generous and immediately sent him enough to return to Japan Noguchi bought a ticket and sailed to visit her and accept the Imperial Prize on September 5, 1915. Noguchi was surrounded at the dock with reporters. He greeted his mentors Chiwaki and Kobayashi at the Imperial Hotel. Noguchi presented them with golden watches as gifts.

When Noguchi greeted his mother, he showed her a photograph of Mary and she approved. Noguchi spent another ten whole days with his mother, but returned to the United States, and this would be the last time he would be back in Japan. In November 1918, his mother Shika died.

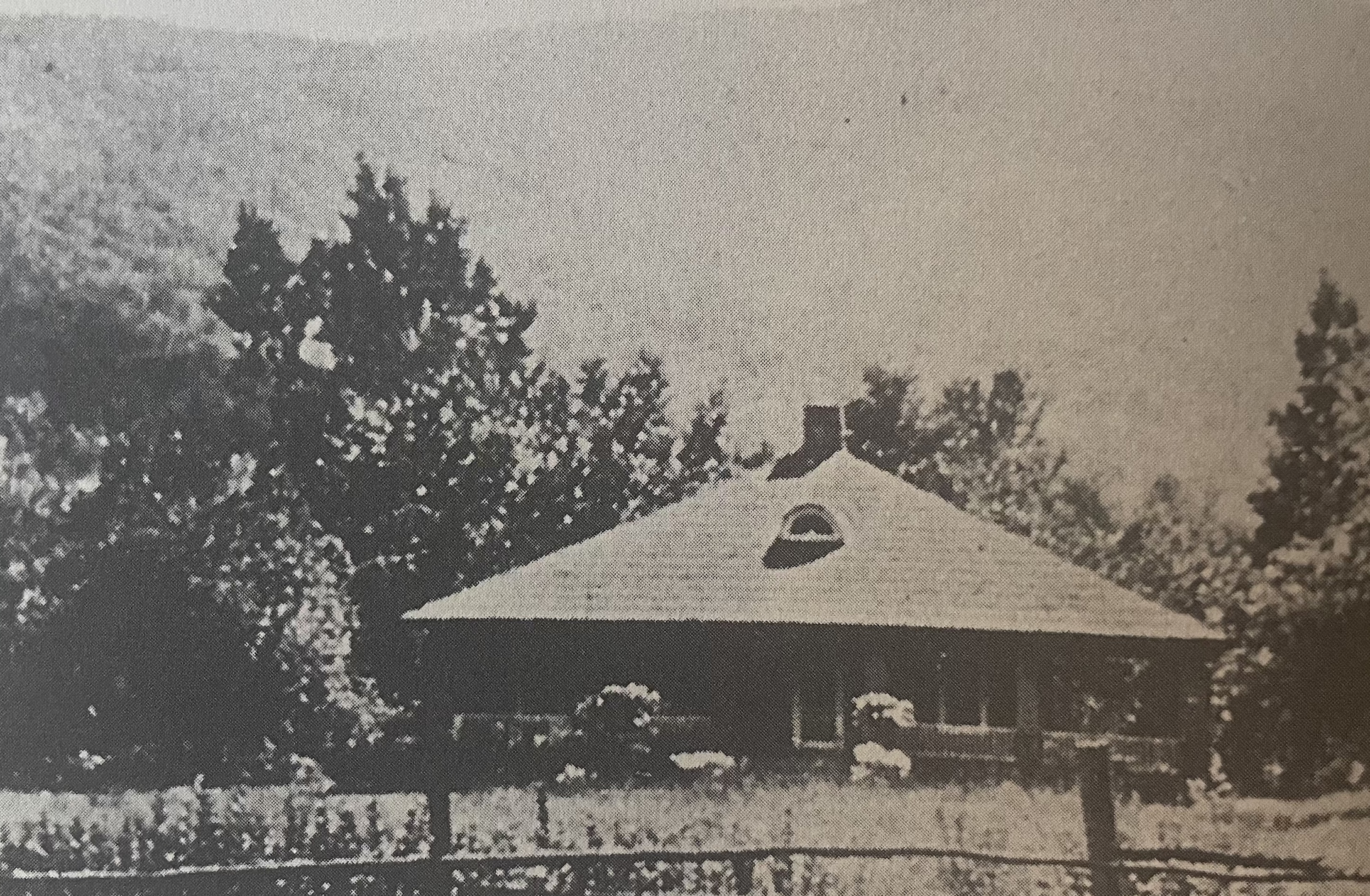
Hideyo Noguchi's house in Shandaken

=== Illness and recovery in the Catskills ===
In 1917, Noguchi's health had declined. Earlier Noguchi was told he had enlarged heart from his irregular intense activity after a physical examination. Mary called an ambulance since he refused to go to the hospital and was brought to Mount Sinai hospital. He was diagnosed with typhoid fever, a severe case with perforation of his digestive tract. He claimed it was jaundice after accidentally digesting. His fever worsened and Mary and those around him thought he might die.

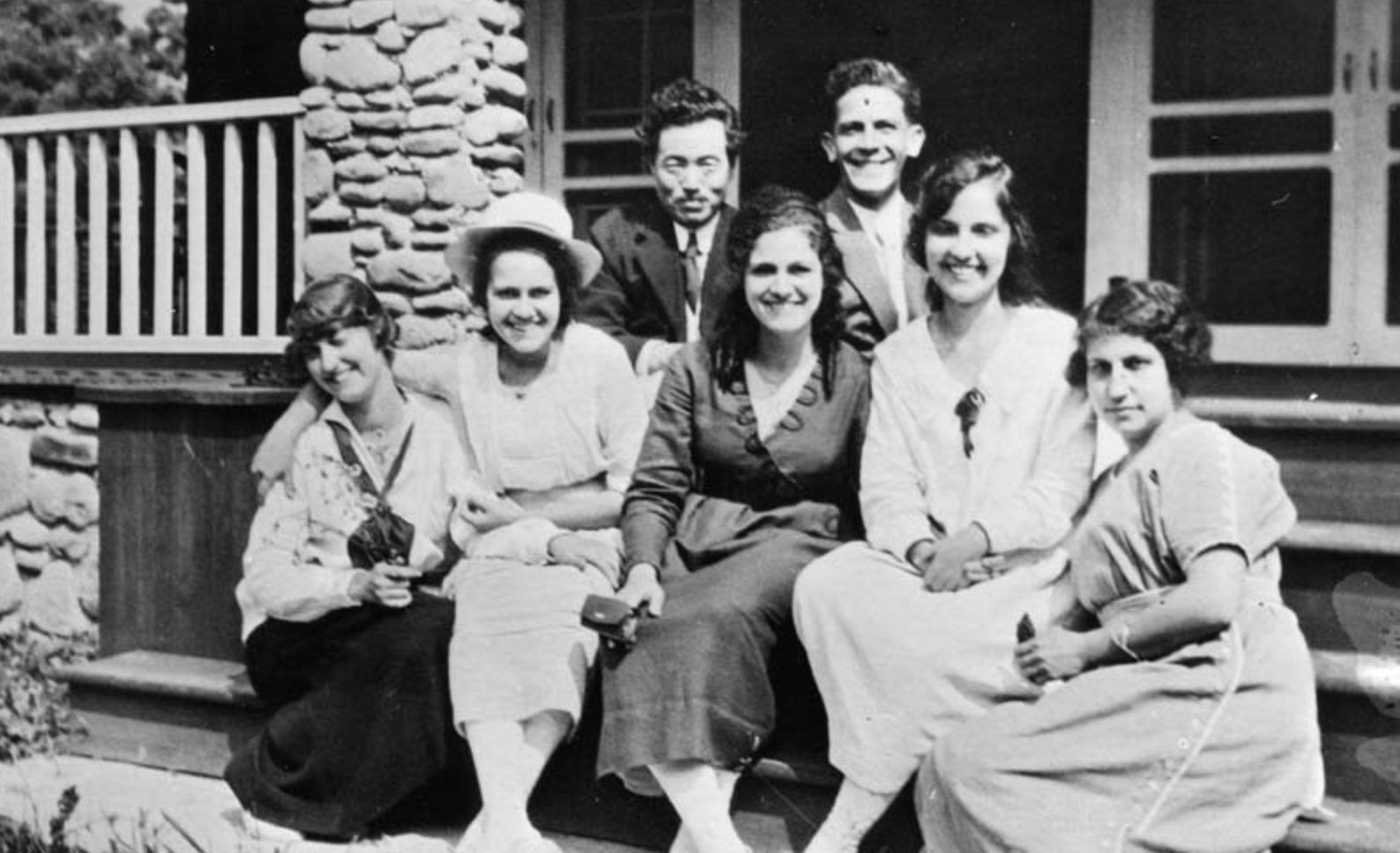
Hideyo Noguchi (top left) with friends on his porch

Hoshi financially supported him during his treatment. He made a slow recovery, Noguchi and Mary after seeing an advertisement in a newspaper took a four hour train ride to the Catskills. Both of them booked a room at the Glenbrook Hotel in the small hamlet of Shandaken, which had less than a hundred people. Noguchi felt it reminded him of his hometown in Fukushima.

Noguchi decided to purchase approximately two hectares and build a house in Shandaken, becoming one of the largest landowners in the hamlet. He bought it with the money he had leftover for his treatment. The construction was completed around June 15, 1918. Noguchi built his home alongside the Esopus river where he would fish and paint and spend most of his summers in 1918, 1922, and 1925 to 1927.

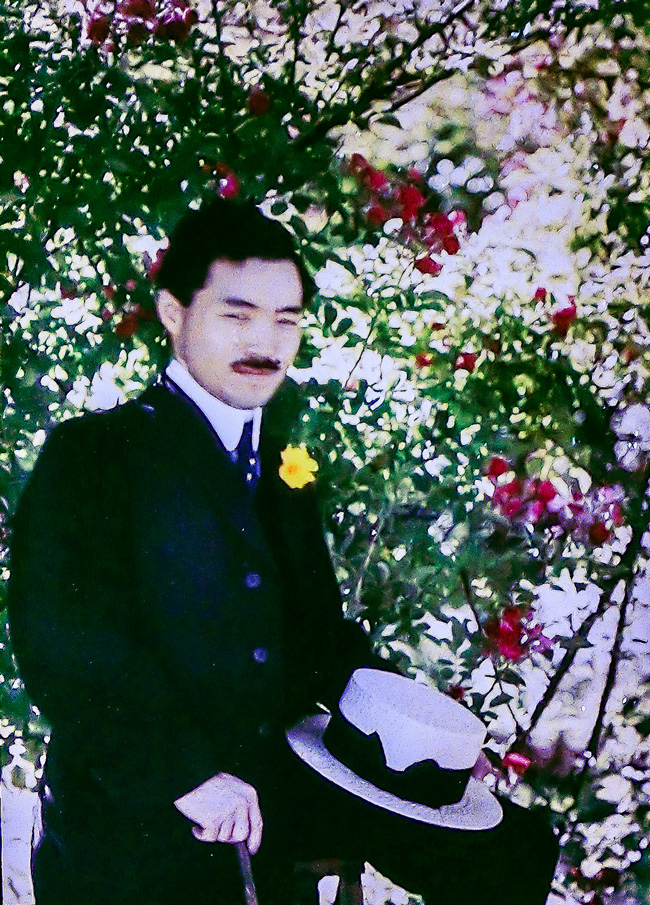
Portrait of Hideyo Noguchi using color photography

=== Hobbies ===
Noguchi was gifted oil paints from Ichiro Hori and he started painting in Shandaken. He had excellent success. Ichiro said, "he would be good at anything" and was not surprised at his painting ability. His paintings hang in the Hideyo Noguchi Memorial Museum.

Noguchi was an amateur photographer. It was said that there is no scientific researcher who likes photography more than Noguchi. He might have been one of the first non hand colored photographs of a Japanese person. He achieved this through using autochrome lumière. He sent this in a letter, dated August 8, 1914, to his childhood mentor, Sakae Kobayashi.

Noguchi was fluent in Japanese and English, but also spoke German, Dutch, French, Mandarin, Danish and Spanish.

== Luetin experiment and the antivivisectionists ==
In 1911 and 1912 at the Rockefeller Institute in New York City, Noguchi was working on a syphilis skin test, which could provide an additional diagnostic procedure to complement the Wassermann test in the detection of syphilis.

Professor William Henry Welch, Board of Scientific Directors at the Rockefeller Institute for Medical Research, urged Noguchi to conduct human trials. The subjects were gathered from clinics and hospitals across New York City. In the experiment, the doctors given the tests injected an inactive product of syphilis, called luetin, under the skin on the upper arm of the patient.

=== Method and Clinical Trials ===
Skin reactions were studied, as they varied among healthy subjects and syphilis patients, based on the disease's stage and its treatment. The lutein test gave a positive reaction almost 100 percent for congenital and late syphilis. While his diagnostic test was effective, it never had a reliable supply from the organism in pure culture form, never yielding practical results.

Of the 571 subjects, 315 had syphilis. The remaining subjects were controls; some of which were orphans between the ages of 2 and 18 years. Most were hospital patients being treated for diseases, such as malaria, leprosy, tuberculosis, and pneumonia, and the subjects did not realize they were being experimented on and could not give consent.

=== Public reactions to the experiment ===
Critics at the time, mainly from the anti-vivisectionist movement, noted that the Rockefeller Institute violated the rights of vulnerable orphans and hospital patients. There was concern among anti-vivisectionists that the test subjects had contracted syphilis from the experiments, but were proven to be false.

In Dr. Noguchi's defense, Noguchi had performed tests on animals to ensure the safety of the lutein test. Rockefeller Institute business manager Jerome D. Greene wrote a letter to the Anti-Vivisection Society, which had pointed out that Noguchi had tested it on himself and his fellow researchers before administering it.

In a letter to District Attorney Charles S. Whitman, Greene said

"What public institution would not welcome a harmless and painless test which would enable it to decide in the case of every person admitted whether that person was afflicted with a venereal disease or not?"

Much of the information came from newspapers, which did not consult medical professionals. Greene mentioned the steps taken to ensure the sterility. His explanation was considered a demonstration of the care that doctors were taking in research.

In May 1912, the New York Society for the Prevention for Cruelty to Children asked the New York district attorney to press charges against Noguchi, but he declined. Although, none of subjects were infected with syphilis, the Rockefeller Institute did test on patients without consent.

Even though none of the subjects were injured in the experiment, Hideyo Noguchi had committed a wrong, it was 'a wrong without injury'.Albert Leffingwell, a physician, social reformer, and advocate for vivisectionist restrictions, said in response to Jerome D. Greene.

"If insurance could have been given that the luetin test implied no risk of any kind, might not the Rockefeller Institute have secured any number of volunteers by the offer of a gratuity of twenty or thirty dollars as a compensation for any discomfort that might be endured?"

=== Lack of informed consent ===
During the period, consent in medical science was by no means customary. The United States did not develop sufficient consensus about unethical human experimentation until the late 20th century, which brought laws about involving informed consent and the rights of patients to pass.

Noguchi received significant scrutiny. One of the newspapers described him as "the Oriental admirer of the fruits of Western civilization." At the same time, notable microbiologists, such as Robert Koch in 1906 to 1907 operated medical concentration camps in Africa to find a cure for sleeping sickness and blinded patients, and Louis Pasteur experimented on nine-year-old Joseph Meister without a medical license and was suspected to have lied about conducting animal trials. They received far less scrutiny on their legacy.

== Later career ==
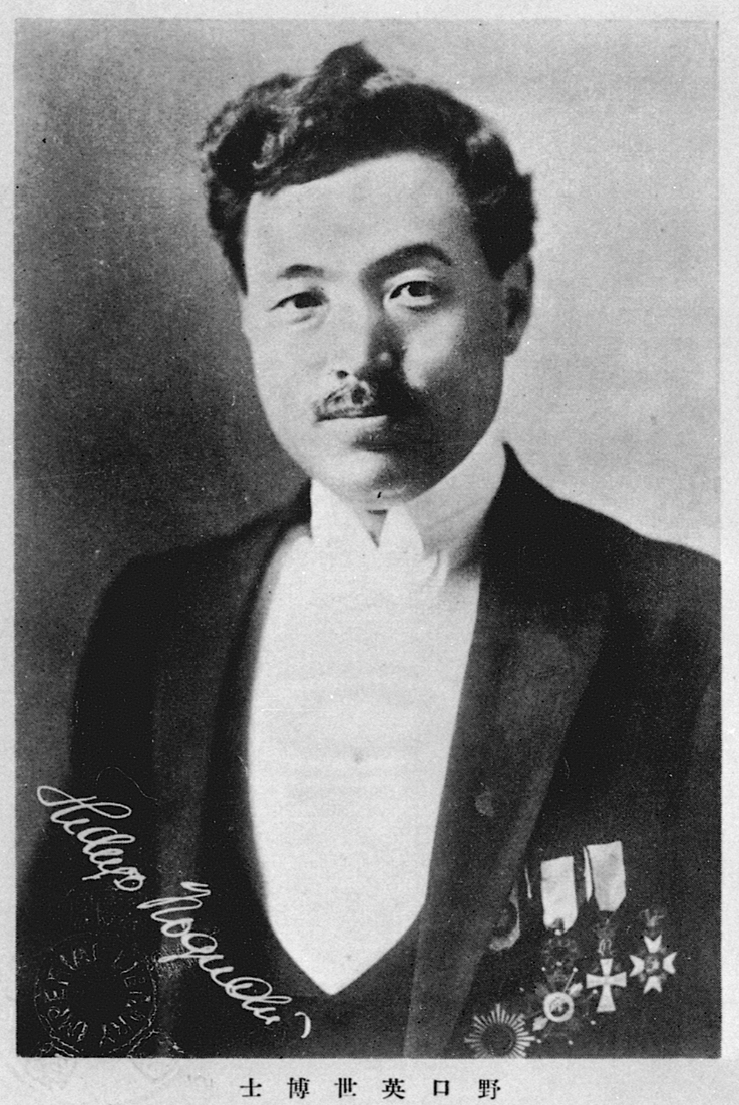
Noguchi decorated with medals

In July, 1914, Flexner made Noguchi a full member of the Institute.

His name and discoveries began to appear regularly in American newspapers. Noguchi felt compelled to make more discoveries and pressure from his boss Simon Flexner and home country to bring respect and honor to his fellow Japanese. He wrote in a letter,

"I am almost exhausted and I feel the weight of my situation, because every one working at this Institute is expected by the outsiders to do something. Yet, as you know, we cannot find a new thing every day!"

=== Successes in tropical diseases ===
Noguchi began to tackle Rocky mountain spotted fever, similar to another disease Tsutsugamushi present in Japan, where deaths were common among rice planters and farmers. Furthermore, he began researching jaundice after two Japanese scientists announced a discovery of a spirochete appearing in the liver of a guinea pig demonstrating jaundice.

In June of 1918, Noguchi became chief investigator on a commission of the International Health Board traveled throughout Central America and South America to conduct research to develop a vaccine for yellow fever.

He once said, "Whether I succeed or not is another matter, but the problem is worth trying." Noguchi dabbled in researching numerous diseases at the same time. He felt one might get results.

In 1921, he was elected as a member of the American Philosophical Society. In the meantime, Noguchi published a revision of Serum Diagnosis of Syphilis with assistance from Evelyn Tilden in 1922, Laboratory Diagnosis of Syphilis, which aided in the diagnosis and treatment of the disease.

In 1923, Noguchi had attempted creating passive and active immunity for Rocky mountain spotted fever. One of his close assistants died during the research, which he mourned. He supported his assistants widow and children. He made a breakthrough when he produced the first antiserum for the disease to render partial immunity.

During his time in Peru and Ecuador, between 1925 to 1927, he worked on Carrions disease and verruca peruana, which was widespread in the regions, and proved the infections were due to the same species, Bartonella bacilliformis.

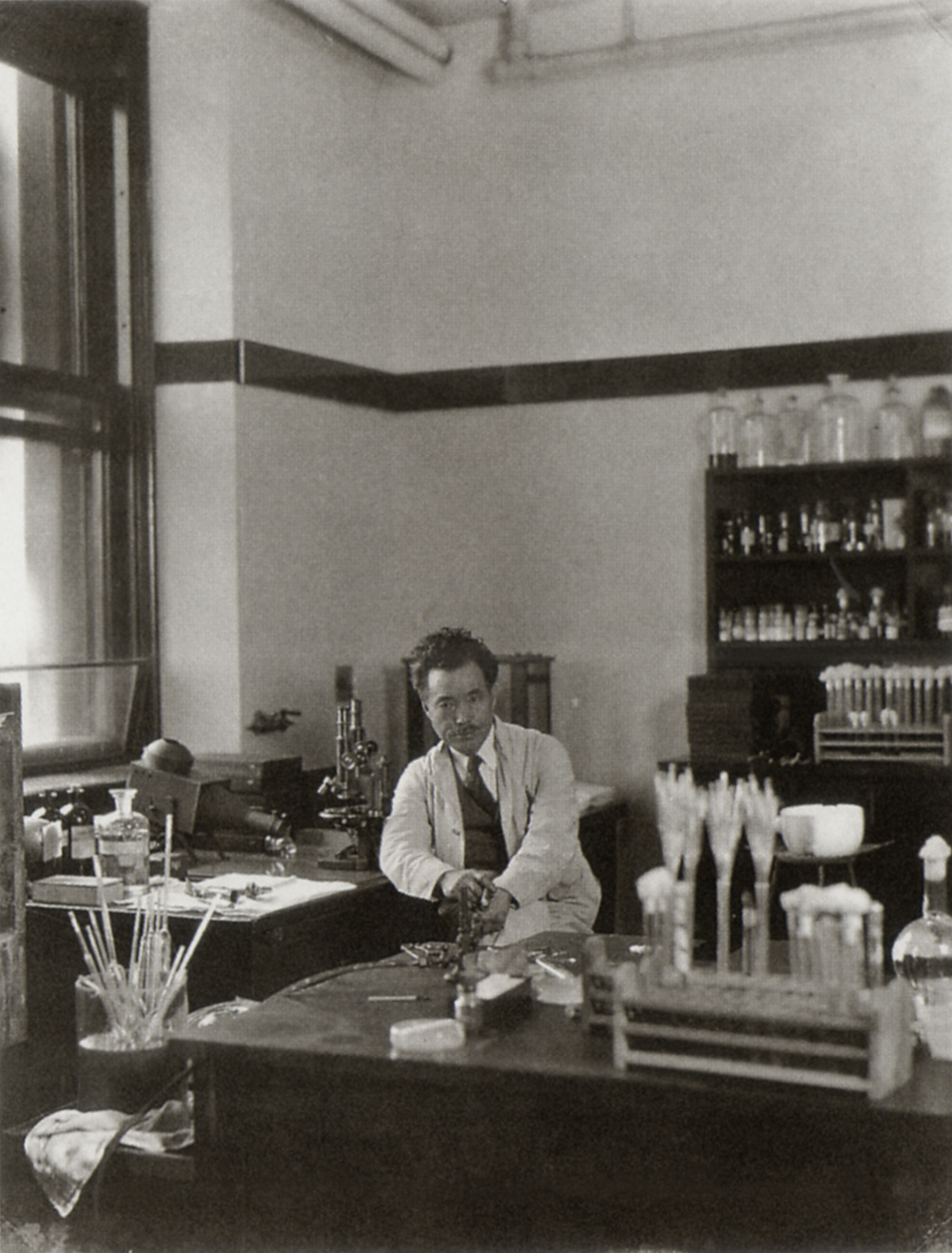
Hideyo Noguchi in his Rockefeller laboratory

His assistant, Akatsu, noted Noguchi showed discontent in his career even with recent breakthroughs. Noguchi sometimes lost his temper and scolding his assistants, but outside of the laboratory, Noguchi was a different and more open person. He would invite him to restaurants and speak Japanese – something he never did at the Rockefeller Institute. In a letter to Flexner, he wrote,

"Somehow I cannot manage to find enough time to sit quietly and think over things calmly and reflect upon many things and phases in life. I seem to be chasing something all the time, perhaps an acquired habit or rather the lack of poise".

=== Controversial research on yellow fever ===
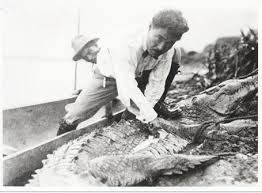
Hideyo Noguchi dissecting a crocodile along the Rio Grande

Noguchi decided to focus on yellow fever, which some of his colleagues died researching because of his experience with syphilis and spirochetes. He thought the disease could have been a spirochete after traveling to Merida, Mexico and seeing patients demonstrate symptoms of Weil's disease, but similar to yellow fever. He identified it as Leptospira icterohemorrhagiae and mistakingly declaring it the causative agent of yellow fever. Other scientists unable to repeat his findings, it was questioned.

During his career, whether yellow fever was a virus or a bacteria was a debated topic with viruses having been discovered in 1892. Noguchi worked much of the next ten years to prove his theory that it was from spir bacteria. He even thought he developed a vaccine against it, unknowingly for Weil's disease.

Following the death of British pathologist Adrian Stokes from yellow fever in September 1927, it became increasingly evident that yellow fever was caused by a virus, not by the bacillus Leptospira icteroides, as Noguchi believed. He began preparing to travel to Accra, Gold Coast (modern-day Ghana) to study yellow fever and get closer to specimens. Noguchi believed himself immune to yellow fever because of his own vaccine.

=== West Africa ===
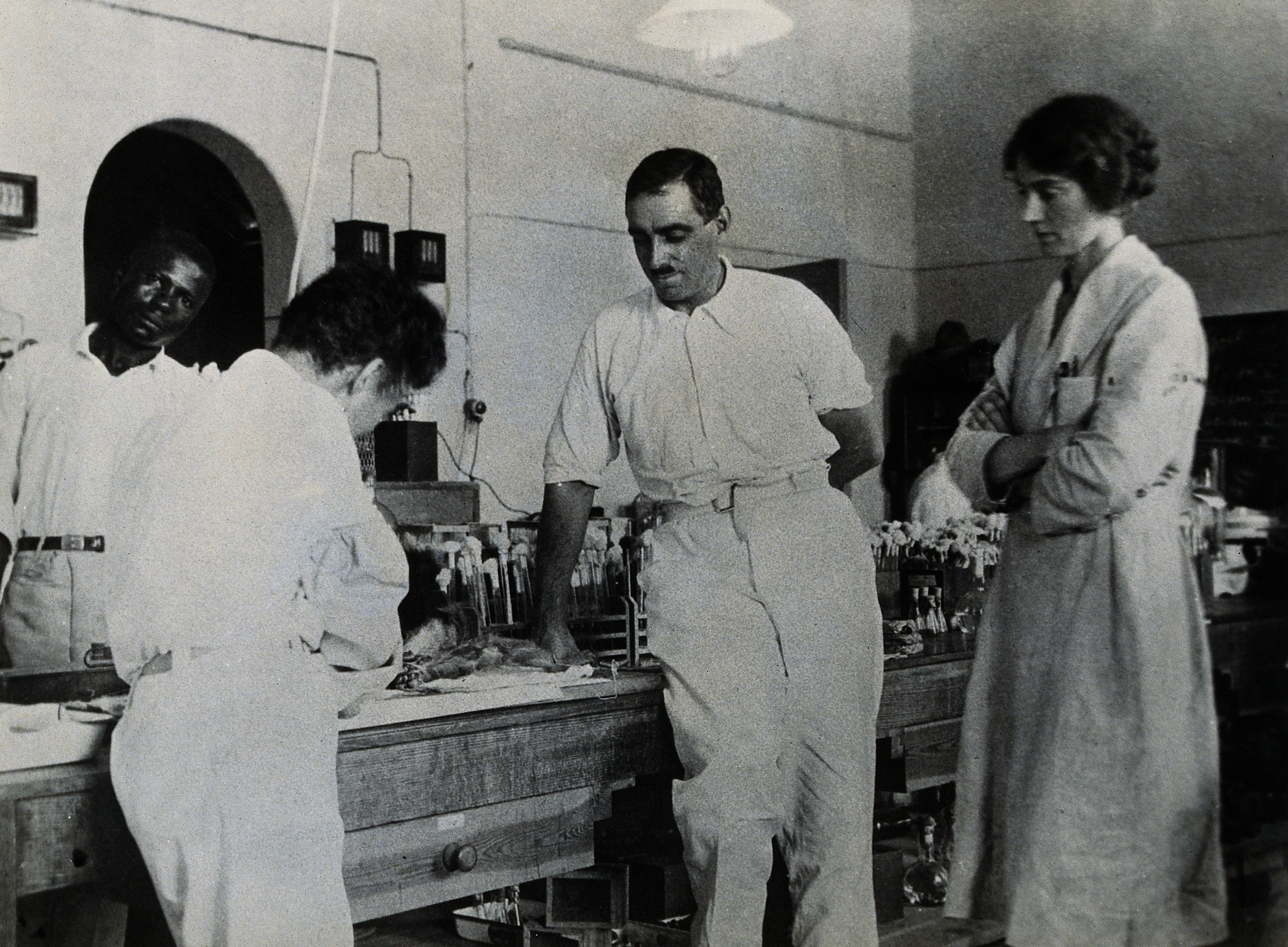
Hideyo Noguchi (facing backwards) and William Young in Accra

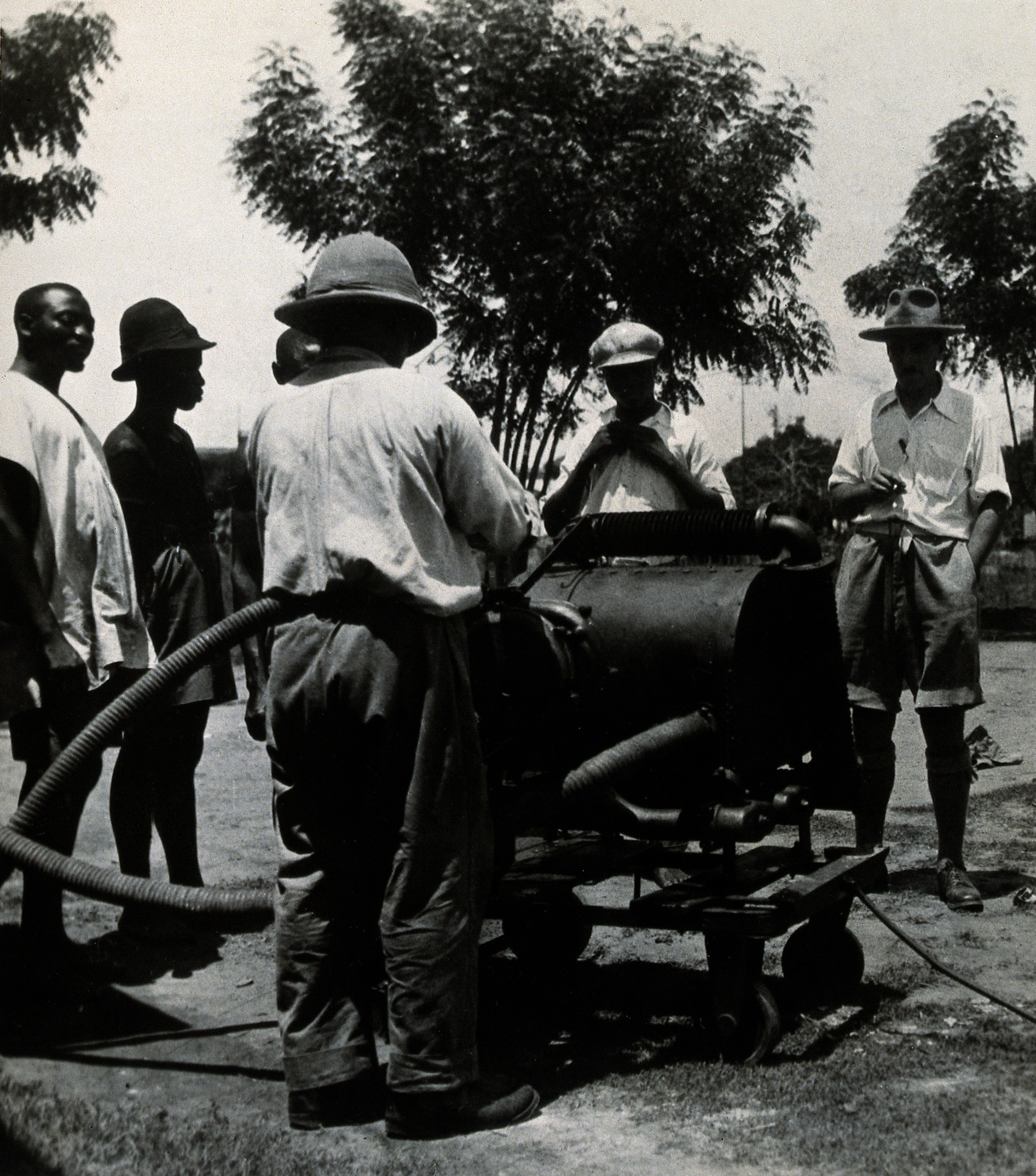
Disinfecting Hideyo Noguchi's laboratory in Accra

Feeling his reputation was at stake, Noguchi hastened to Lagos to carry out research. However, he found the working conditions in Lagos did not suit him. At the invitation of Dr. William Alexander Young, the young director of the British Medical Research Institute, he moved and made this his base in 1927.

The diaries of Oskar Klotz, another researcher with the Rockefeller Foundation, describe Noguchi's temper and behavior as erratic and bordering on the paranoid. One reason might be he had untreated syphilis, for which he was diagnosed in 1913, but it could have progressed to neurosyphilis, prone to personality changes.

According to Klotz, Noguchi inoculated huge numbers of monkeys with yellow fever, but failed to keep proper records.

== Death ==
Despite this, Noguchi failed to keep infected mosquitoes in their secure containers. In May 1928, having been unable to find evidence for his theories, Noguchi was set to return to New York after spending six months in Africa, but became sick. Noguchi boarded to sail home but on May 12 was put ashore at Accra. He taken to a hospital and he died on 21 May.

During his last letters to Mary, he writes

“I spend every moment of every day waiting for a telegram from you. When I am dispirited or tired, you are the one thing that raises my spirits. I am always thinking of you. It is rare that I dream but when I do, it is always of you.”

In a letter home, Young states, "He died suddenly noon Monday. I saw him Sunday afternoon – he smiled – and amongst other things, said, “Are you sure you are quite well?" "Quite." I said, and then he said "I don’t understand." His obituary was featured in The New York Times. Doing his autopsy, he was found to have a syphilitic heart. Seven days later, despite exhaustive sterilization of the site, Young himself died of yellow fever.

== Legacy ==
Noguchi was profoundly influential during his lifetime. He brought newfound attention to obscure and tropical diseases, such as trachoma, affecting a large part of developing countries in Africa, often ignored by western scientists.

Furthermore, Noguchi and Tilden's identification of the leishmaniasis pathogen and proving Carrion's disease and Oroya fever one of the same. He was applauded for his discovery in South America and had a 2.1 km street in Guayaquil, Ecuador named after him.

His most famous contribution was his identification of syphilis in the brain tissues of patients with paralysis due to meningoencephalitis. In addition to his lasting contributions to the use of snake venom and serums for Rocky Mountain spotted fever.

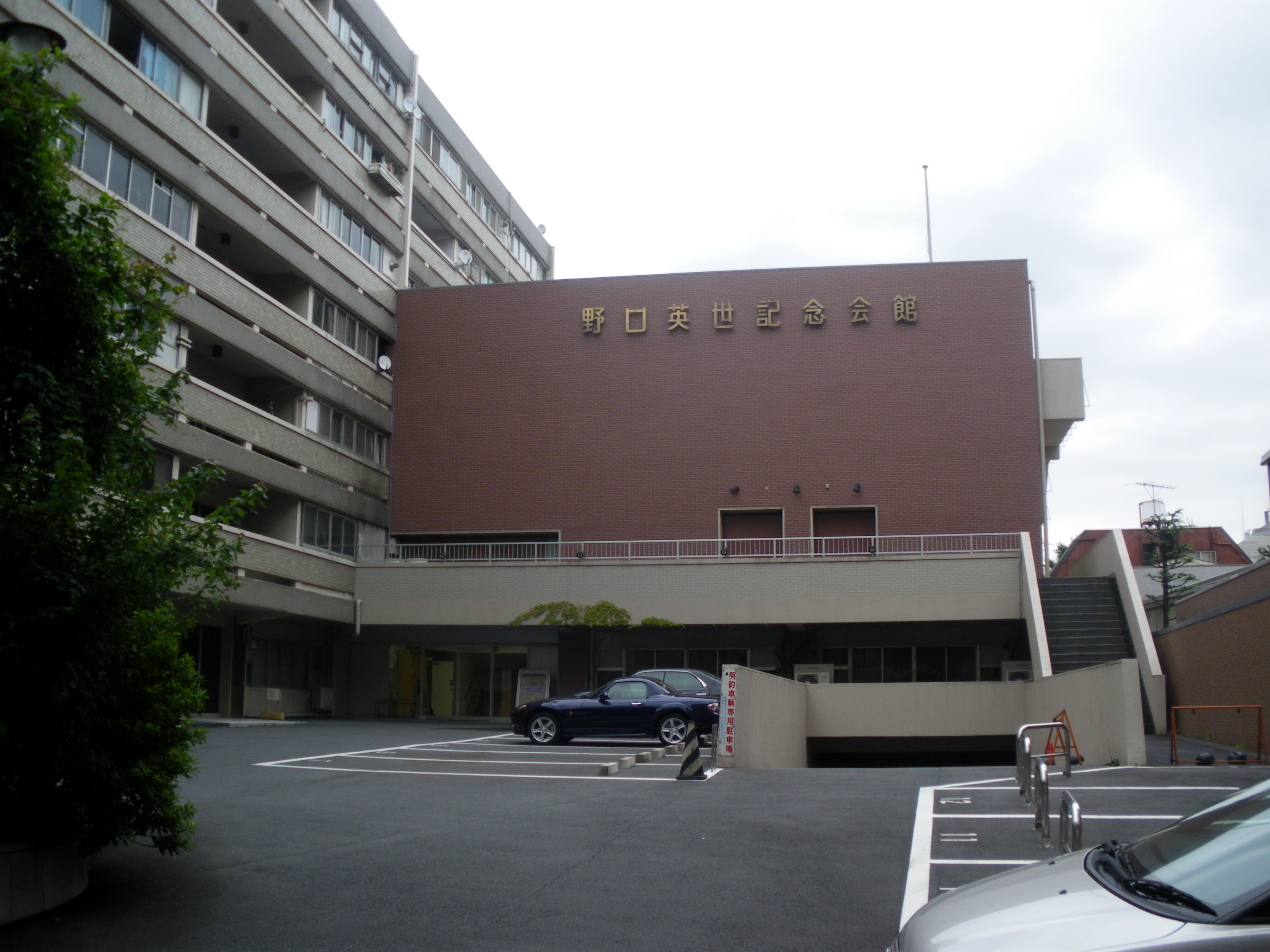
Hideyo Noguchi Memorial Museum

In the 21st century, the Nobel Foundation archives were opened for public inspection and research. Noguchi was nominated several times for the Nobel Prize in Physiology or Medicine: in 1913–1915, 1920, 1921 and 1924–1927.

=== Posthumous retractions ===
With the electron microscope, which was invented two years after his passing, some of his discoveries became understood as mistaken.

Some of his research, including his discovery of polio, rabies, trachoma, and yellow fever's cause were not able to be reproduced. His finding that Noguchia granulosis causes trachoma was questioned within a year of his death. His identification of Leptospira icterohemorrhagiae as yellow fever was disproven after Max Theiler discovery. Furthermore, his rabies pathogen medium to cultivate bacteria was prone to contamination.

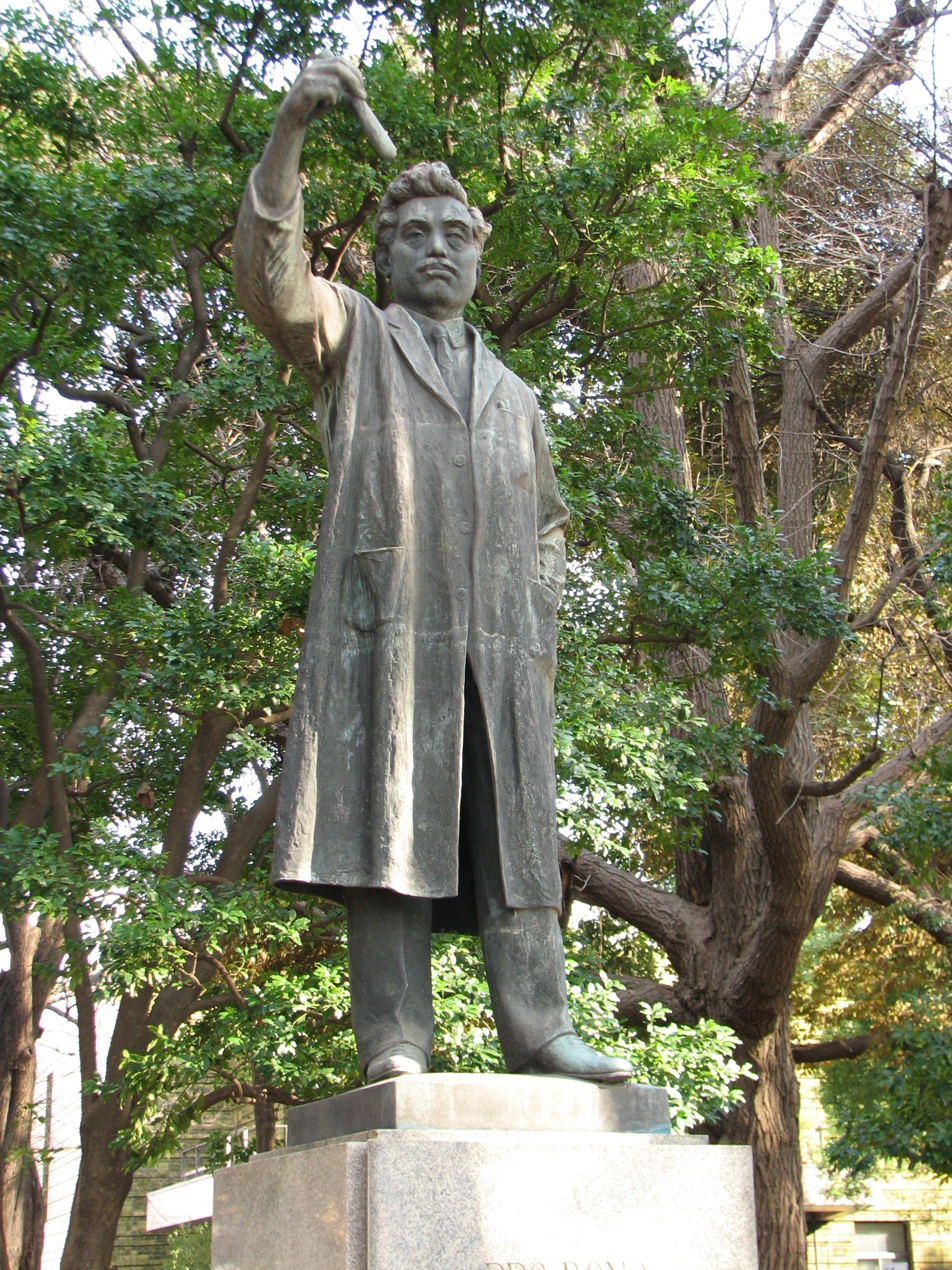
Statue of Hideyo Noguchi in Ueno Park

A Rockefeller Institute researcher criticized him for being unwilling to issue retractions for his claims, but others said it was more flaws inside the system of peer review at the Institute.

== Selected works ==
- 1904: The Action of Snake Venom Upon Cold-blooded Animals.

Washington, D.C.: Carnegie Institution. OCLC 2377892

- 1909: Snake Venoms: An Investigation of Venomous Snakes with Special Reference to the Phenomena of Their Venoms.

Washington, D.C.: Carnegie Institution. OCLC 14796920

- 1911: Serum Diagnosis of Syphilis and the Butyric Acid Test for Syphilis.

Philadelphia: J. B. Lippincott. OCLC 3201239

- 1923: Laboratory Diagnosis of Syphilis: A Manual for Students and Physicians.

New York: P. B. Hoeber. OCLC 14783533

== Honors during Noguchi's lifetime ==
Noguchi was honored with Japanese and foreign decorations. He received honorary degrees from a number of universities.

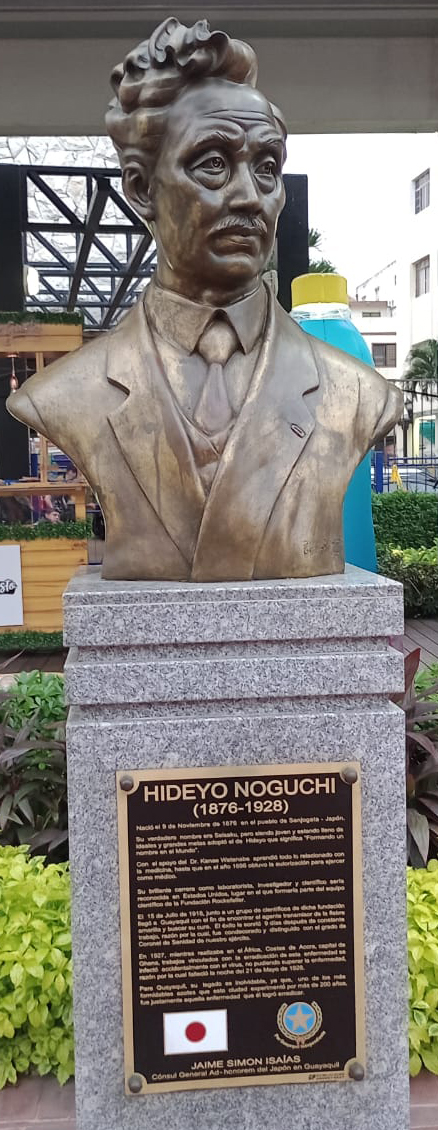
The bust of the Japanese scientist and doctor Hideyo Noguchi was inaugurated on June 22, 2018, outside the Crystal Palace in Guayaquil

Noguchi was self-effacing in his public life, and he often referred to himself as "Funny Noguchi" as noted in Times Magazine. When Noguchi was awarded an honorary doctorate at Yale, William Lyon Phelps observed that the kings of Spain, Denmark and Sweden had conferred awards, but "perhaps he appreciates even more than royal honors the admiration and the gratitude of the people."

- Kyoto Imperial University, Doctor of Medicine, 1909.
- Knight of the Order of Dannebrog, 1913 (Denmark).
- Commander of the Order of Isabella the Catholic, 1913 (Spain).
- Commander of the Order of the Polar Star, 1914 (Sweden).
- Tokyo Imperial University, Doctor of Science, 1914.
- Order of the Rising Sun, Gold Rays with Rosette, 1915.
- Imperial Award, Imperial Academy (Japan), 1915.
- Central University of Ecuador, 1919, (Ecuador).
- National University of San Marcos, 1920, (Peru)
- Medicine School of Merida, "Doctor Honoris Causa en Medicina y Cirugía", 1920 (México)
- John Scott Medal, 1921, (United States)
- University of Guayaquil, 1919, Ecuador.
- Yale University, 1921, (United States).
- Knight of the Legion of Honour of France, 1924
- Senior fifth rank in the order of precedence, Japanese government, 1925

== Posthumous honors ==
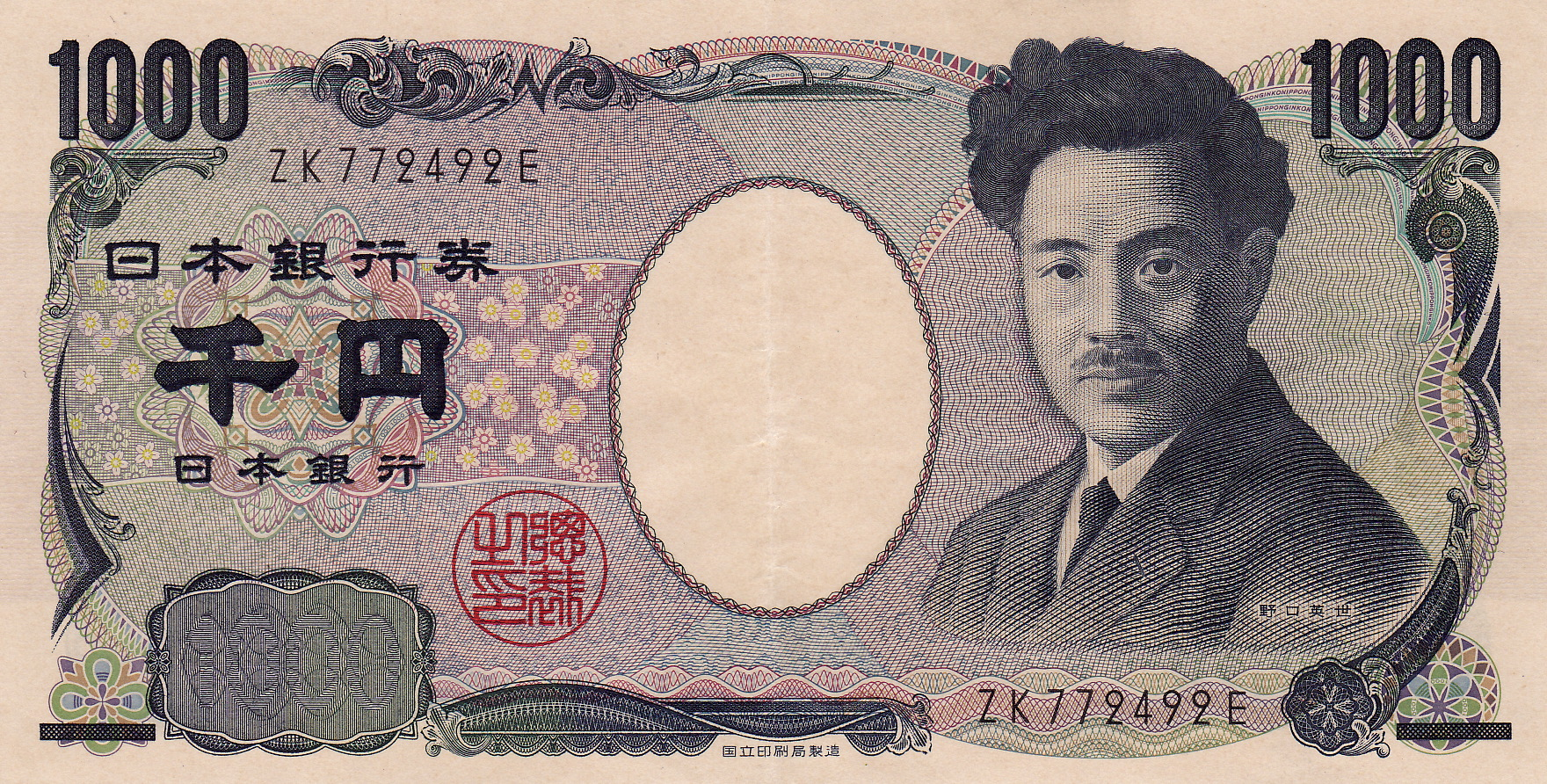
Hideyo Noguchi on the ¥1,000 banknote

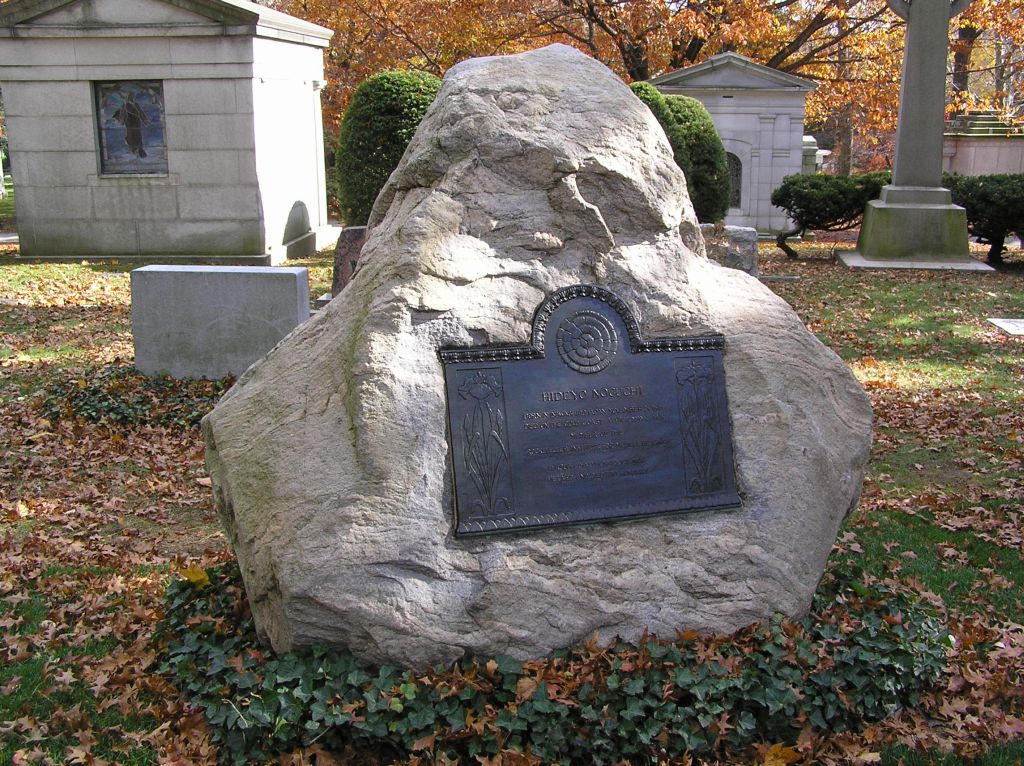
The grave of Hideyo Noguchi in Woodlawn Cemetery

Noguchi's remains were returned to the United States and buried in Woodlawn Cemetery in the Bronx, New York City.

In 1928, the Japanese government awarded Noguchi the Order of the Rising Sun, Gold and Silver Star, which represents the second highest of eight classes associated with the award.

In 1979, the Noguchi Memorial Institute for Medical Research (NMIMR) was founded with funds donated by the Japanese government at the University of Ghana in Legon, a suburb north of Accra.

In 1981, the Instituto Nacional de Salud Mental (National Institute of Mental Health) "Honorio Delgado – Hideyo Noguchi" was founded with founds of the Peruvian Government and the JICA (Japan International Cooperation Agency) in Lima – Perú.

Dr. Noguchi's portrait has been printed on Japanese 1000 yen banknotes issued since 2004. In addition, the house near Inawashiro where he was born and brought up is preserved. It is operated as part of a museum to his life and achievements.

Noguchi's name is honored at the Centro de Investigaciones Regionales Dr. Hideyo Noguchi at the Universidad Autónoma de Yucatán.

== Hideyo Noguchi Africa Prize ==
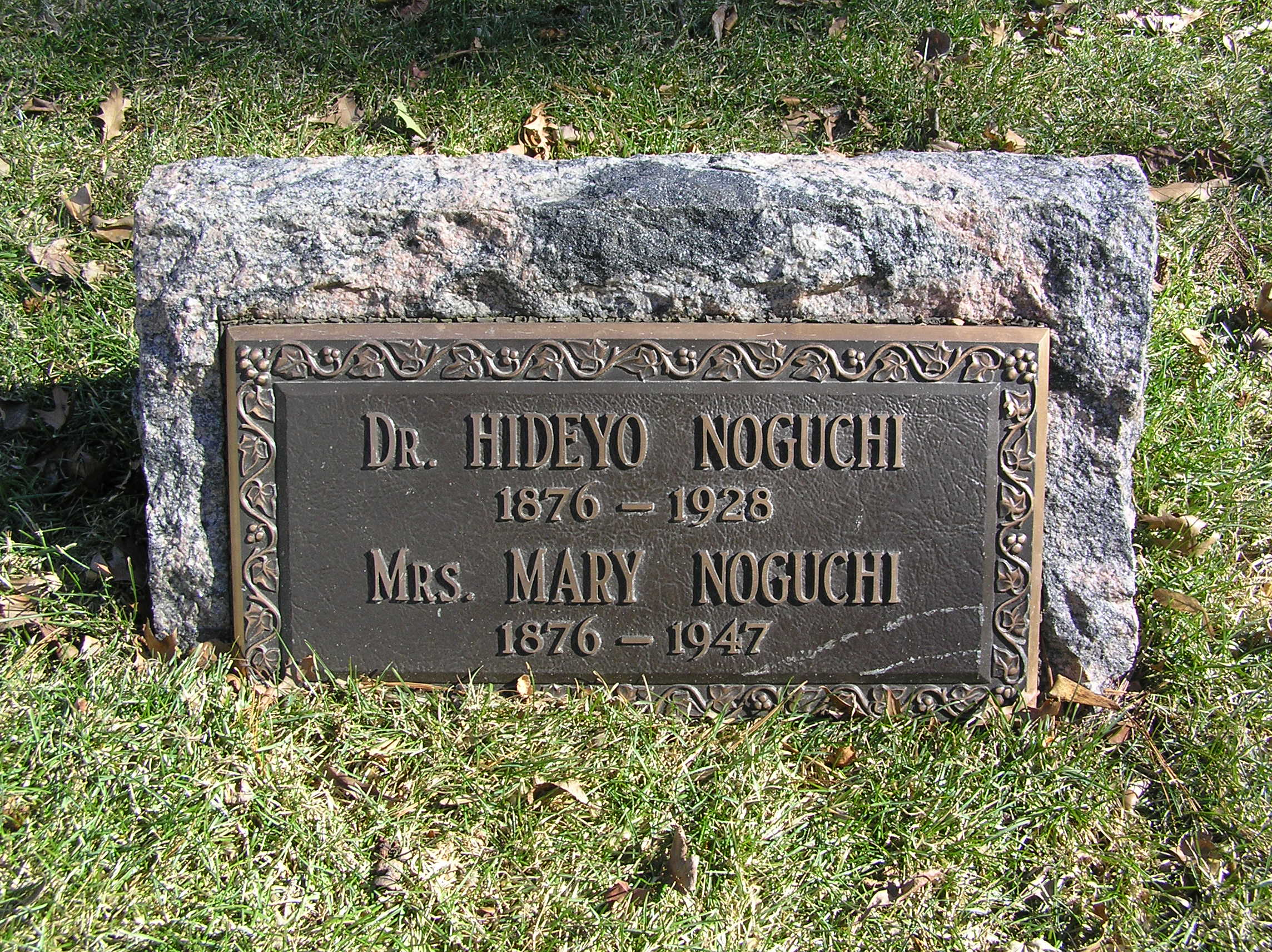
The footstone of Hideyo Noguchi in Woodlawn Cemetery, New York City

The Japanese Government established the Hideyo Noguchi Africa Prize in July 2006 as a new international medical research and services award to mark the official visit by Prime Minister Jun'ichirō Koizumi to Africa in May 2006 and the 80th anniversary of Dr. Noguchi's death. The Prize is awarded to individuals with outstanding achievements in combating various infectious diseases in Africa or in establishing innovative medical service systems. The presentation ceremony and laureate lectures coincided with the Fourth Tokyo International Conference on African Development in late April 2008. In 2009, the conference venue was moved from Tokyo to Yokohama as another way of honoring the man after whom the prize was named. In 1899, Dr. Noguchi worked at the Yokohama Port Quarantine Office as an assistant quarantine doctor.

The Prize is expected to be awarded every five years. The prize has been made possible through a combination of government funding and private donations.

== See also ==
- List of medicine awards
- Max Theiler – completed Noguchi's work, yellow fever vaccine (1926)
- Human experimentation in the United States
- Tōki Rakujitsu – Japanese film
