= Daniel Alcides Carrión =

Peruvian medical student (1857–1885)

Daniel Alcides Carrión García
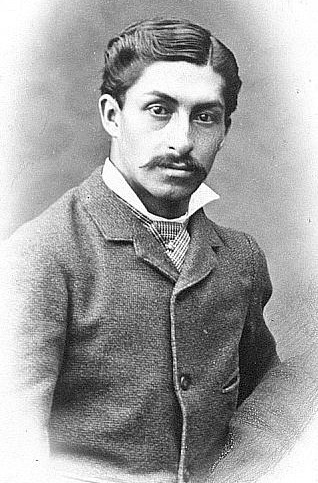
- Daniel Alcides Carrión García
- Born: August 12, 1857; Cerro de Pasco, Peru
- Died: October 5, 1885 (aged 28); Lima, Peru
- Known for: Carrion's disease (Oroya fever)
- Scientific career
- Fields: Medicine

Daniel Alcides Carrión García (August 12, 1857 – October 5, 1885) was a Peruvian medical student after whom Carrion's disease is named.

== Fatal experiment ==
Carrión described the disease in the course of what proved to be a fatal experiment upon himself in 1885, in order to demonstrate definitively the cause of the illness. He was inoculated by close friends with blood which had been taken from a wart of a 14-year-old patient. Carrión's aim was to prove a link between the acute blood stage of Oroya fever with that of the later chronic form of the disease, called verruga peruana, typified by numerous red, wart-like dermal nodules. Neither the cause nor mode of transmission of Oroya fever was then known and, furthermore, the relationship between the acute and chronic forms of the disease was not yet proven. Carrión developed the classic symptoms of the acute phase of the disease, thereby establishing the link.

After Carrión's death from the disease, a fellow student who had assisted in the experiment was arrested for his murder, but later released. In 1938 Maxime Hans Kuczyński survived a similar experiment.

== Burial site ==
Carrión is buried in a mausoleum on the premises of the Dos de Mayo National Hospital in Lima.

== National Hero ==
On October 7, 1991, the Peruvian government announced a law (LeyNº 25342), declaring Carrión to be a "National Hero" (Spanish: Héroe Nacional).

== Named in his honour ==
- Carrion's disease as an alternative name for Oroya fever.
- The Daniel Alcides Carrión Province in the Pasco Region.
- October 5 Day of Peruvian Medicine (Spanish: Día de la medicina Peruana).
- The Daniel Alcides Carrión National University (Universidad Nacional Daniel Alcides Carrion) in Cerro de Pasco.
- The National Hospital Hospital Nacional Daniel Alcides Carrión in El Callao.
- The Estadio Daniel Alcides Carrión stadium in the city of Cerro de Pasco.

== See also ==
- Bartonella

== Notes ==
- "Daniel Alcides Carrión". whonamedit.com. Archived from the original on April 25, 2003., short biography on whonamedit.com.
- (in Spanish) Gregorio Delgado García and Ana M. Delgado Rodríguez, Daniel Alcides Carrión y su aporte al conocimiento clínico de la fiebre de la Oroya y verruga peruana, Cuaderno de Historia, No. 80, 1995. First presented at I Congreso Nacional de Historia de la Ciencia y la Técnica. Havana, November 15, 1994.
