= Carrion's disease =

Infectious disease caused by Bartonella bacilliformis

- Other names: Carrión's disease, Oroya fever, Peruvian warts, bartenellosis, verruga peruana (Spanish), verruca peruviana (Latin)
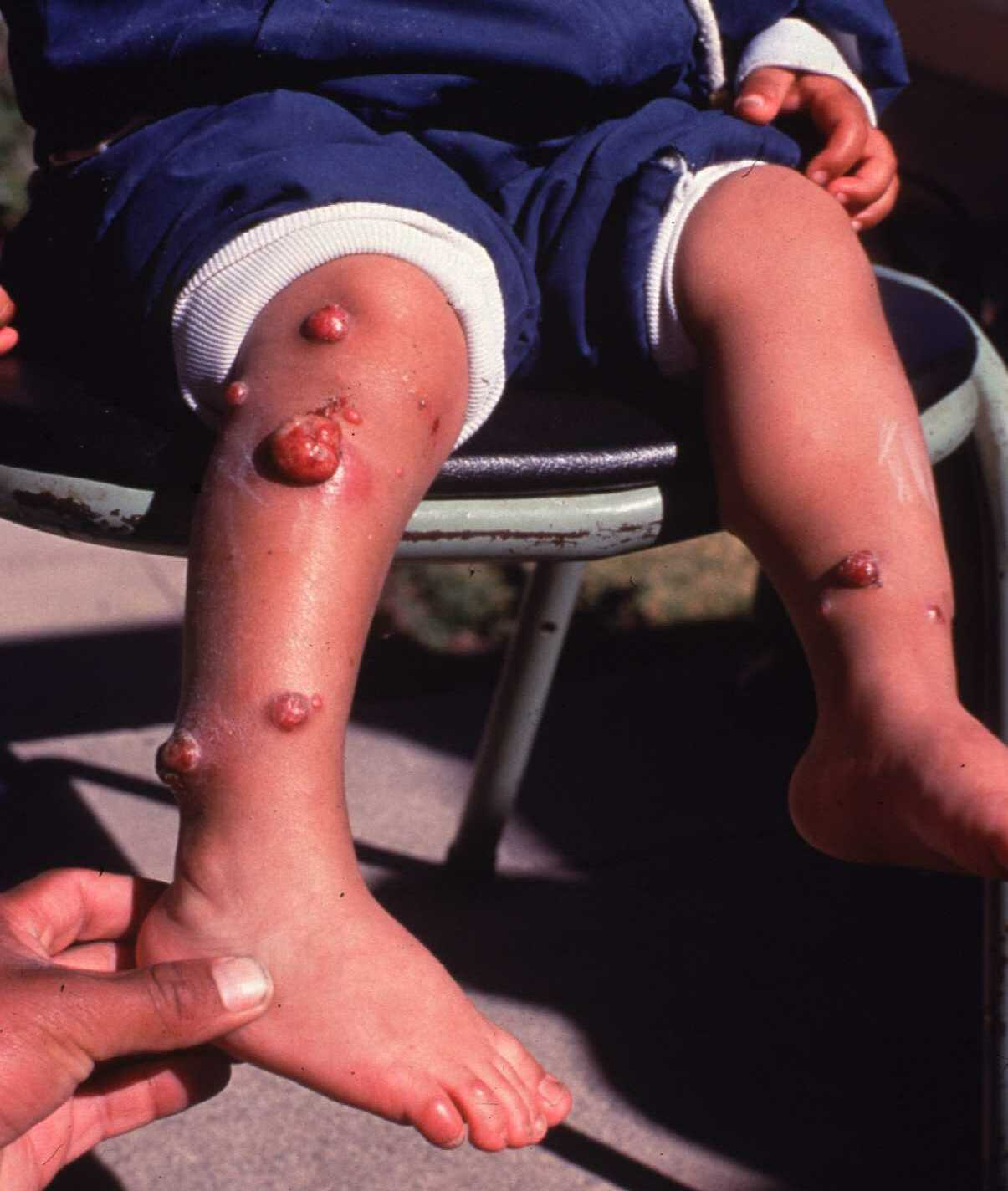
- Carrion's disease chronic phase—verruga peruana (Peruvian warts)
- Specialty: Infectious diseases

Carrion's disease or bartonellosis is a vector-borne infectious disease caused by bacteria in the Bartonella genus. The disease is transmitted by sandfly bites. The disease occurs in two presentations; the acute phase, also called Oroya fever, can be fatal if untreated. The chronic phase produces warts; this is called Peruvian warts, or verruga peruana. This wart stage is rarely fatal. Patients may be affected by both or only one of the phases. Carrion's disease is treated with antibiotics.

== History ==
Carrion's disease is named after Daniel Alcides Carrión, a medical student who died after inoculating himself with Bartonella bacilliformi in order to prove it was the cause of the disease. Bacteriologist Hideyo Noguchi alongside fellow researcher Evelyn Tilden continuing his research after his death proved Carrion's disease and verruga peruana were the same disease. Cases of Carrion's disease that identified in the 20th century were found to be caused by Bartonella bacilliformi. However, in the 21st century, cases of bartenellosis with a similar presentation of Carrion's disease were found to be infected with other species of Bartonella, including B. rochalimae and B. ancashensis.

== Signs and symptoms ==
The clinical symptoms of bartonellosis are pleomorphic and some patients from endemic areas may be asymptomatic. The two classical clinical presentations are the acute phase and the chronic phase, corresponding to the two different host cell types invaded by the bacterium (red blood cells and endothelial cells). An individual can be affected by either or both phases.

=== Acute phase ===
The acute phase is also called the hematic phase or Oroya fever. The most common findings are fever (usually sustained, but with temperature no greater than 102 °F or 39 °C), pale appearance, malaise, painless liver enlargement, jaundice, enlarged lymph nodes, and enlarged spleen. This phase is characterized by severe hemolytic anemia and transient immunosuppression. The case fatality ratios of untreated patients exceeded 40% but reach around 90% when opportunistic infection with Salmonella spp. occurs. In a recent study, the attack rate was 13.8% (123 cases) and the case-fatality rate was 0.7%.

Other symptoms include a headache, muscle aches, and general abdominal pain. Some studies have suggested a link between Carrion's disease and heart murmurs due to the disease's impact on the circulatory system. In children, symptoms of anorexia, nausea, and vomiting have been investigated as possible symptoms of the disease.

Most of the mortality of Carrion's disease occurs during the acute phase. Studies vary in their estimates of mortality. In one study, mortality has been estimated as low as just 1% in studies of hospitalized patients, to as high as 88% in untreated, unhospitalized patients. In developed countries, where the disease rarely occurs, it is recommended to seek the advice of a specialist in infectious disease when diagnosed. Mortality is often thought to be due to subsequent infections due to the weakened immune system and opportunistic pathogen invasion, or consequences of malnutrition due to weight loss in children. In a study focusing on pediatric and gestational effects of the disease, mortality rates for pregnant women with the acute phase were estimated at 40% and rates of spontaneous abortion in another 40%.

=== Chronic phase ===
The chronic phase is also called the eruptive phase or tissue phase, in which the patients develop a cutaneous rash produced by a proliferation of endothelial cells, known as "Peruvian warts" or "verruga peruana". Depending on the size and characteristics of the lesions, there are three types: miliary (1–4 mm), nodular or subdermic, and mular (>5mm). Miliary lesions are the most common. The lesions often ulcerate and bleed.

The most common findings are bleeding of verrugas, fever, malaise, arthralgias (joint pain), anorexia, myalgias, pallor, lymphadenopathy, and liver and spleen enlargement.

On microscopic examination, the chronic phase and its rash are produced by angioblastic hyperplasia, or the increased rates and volume of cell growth in the tissues that form blood vessels. This results in a loss of contact between cells and a loss of normal functioning.

The chronic phase is the more common phase. Mortality during the chronic phase is very low.

== Transmission and cause ==
Carrion's disease is caused by Bartonella bacilliformis. It is transmitted by sandfly bites in the genus Lutzomyia. These sandflies live in the ravines and valleys of the Andes Mountains; primarily in Peru, but also in Colombia and Ecuador. Cases of bartenellosis with a similar presentation of Carrion's disease have been found to be infected with other species of Bartonella, including B. rochalimae and B. ancashensis. There has been no experimental reproduction of the Peruvian wart in animals apart from Macaca mulatta, and there is little research on the disease's natural spread or impact in native animals.

== Diagnosis ==
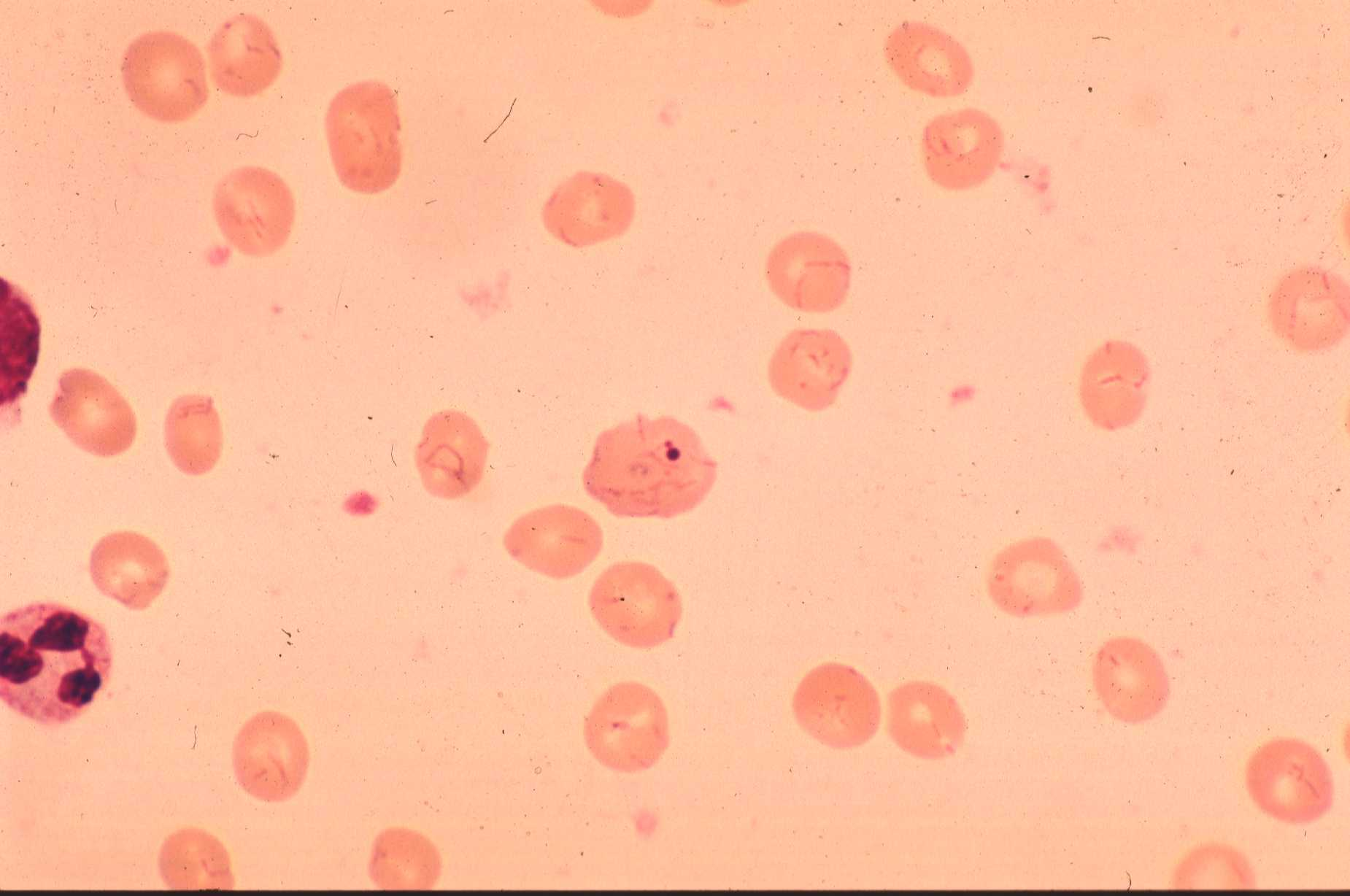
Thin blood film

Diagnosis during the acute phase can be made by obtaining a peripheral blood smear with Giemsa stain, Columbia blood agar cultures, immunoblot, indirect immunofluorescence, and PCR. Diagnosis during the chronic phase can be made using a Warthin–Starry stain of wart biopsy, PCR, and immunoblot.

== Treatment ==
Treatment for Carrion's disease is with antibiotics. Because Carrion's disease is often comorbid with Salmonella infections, chloramphenicol has historically been the antibiotic of choice.

Fluoroquinolones (such as ciprofloxacin) or chloramphenicol in adults and chloramphenicol plus beta-lactams in children are the antibiotic regimens of choice during the acute phase of Carrion's disease. Chloramphenicol-resistant B. bacilliformis has been observed.

During the eruptive phase, in which chloramphenicol is not useful, azithromycin, erythromycin, and ciprofloxacin have been used successfully for treatment. Rifampin or macrolides are also used to treat both adults and children.

Because of the high rates of comorbid infections and conditions, multiple treatments are often required. These have included the use of corticosteroids for respiratory distress, red blood cell transfusions for anemia, pericardiectomies for pericardial tamponades, and other standard treatments.
