= Liver cancer =

- Other names: Hepatic cancer, primary hepatic malignancy, primary liver cancer
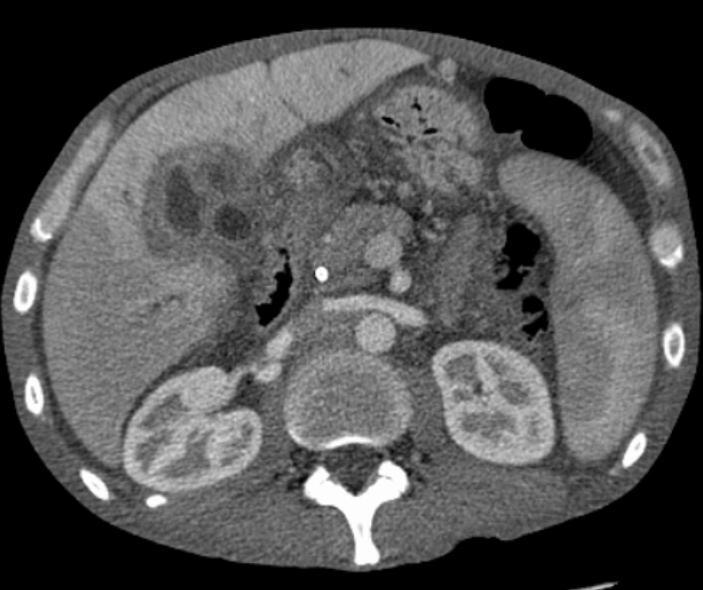
- CT scan of a liver with cholangiocarcinoma
- Specialty: Gastroenterology, hepatology, oncology
- Symptoms: Lump or pain in the right side below the rib cage, swelling of the abdomen, yellowish skin, easy bruising, weight loss, weakness
- Usual onset: 65 to 74 years old
- Causes: Hepatitis B, hepatitis C, alcoholism, aflatoxin, non-alcoholic fatty liver disease, liver flukes
- Diagnostic method: Blood tests, medical imaging, tissue biopsy
- Prevention: Immunization against hepatitis B, treating those infected with hepatitis B or C, decreasing exposure to aflatoxin, decreasing high levels of alcohol consumption
- Treatment: Surgery, targeted therapy, radiation therapy
- Prognosis: Five-year survival rates ~22% (US, 2015–2021); 40% (Japan)
- Frequency: 618,700 (point in time in 2015), 841,000 (2018)
- Deaths: 781,631 (2018)

Liver cancer, also known as hepatic cancer, primary hepatic cancer, or primary hepatic malignancy, is cancer that starts in the liver. Liver cancer can be primary in which the cancer starts in the liver, or it can be liver metastasis, or secondary, in which the cancer spreads from elsewhere in the body to the liver. Liver metastasis is the more common of the two liver cancers. According to the recent analysis, it is shown that metabolic dysfunction–associated steatotic liver disease, which was previously known as non-alcoholic fatty liver disease (NAFLD) and is now considered as one of the leading causes of hepatocellular carcinoma (HCC) globally, especially in developed nations, due to the increasing prevalence of obesity and type 2 diabetes.

Primary liver cancer is globally the seventh-most frequent cancer and the third-leading cause of death from cancer. In 2018, it occurred in 866,136 people and resulted in 758,725 deaths globally. Higher rates of liver cancer occur where hepatitis B and C are common, including Asia and sub-Saharan Africa. Males are more often affected with hepatocellular carcinoma (HCC) than females. Diagnosis is most frequent among those 65 to 74 years old.

The leading cause of liver cancer is cirrhosis due to hepatitis B, hepatitis C, or alcohol. Other causes include aflatoxin, metabolic dysfunction–associated steatotic liver disease (MASLD; formerly NAFLD) and liver flukes. The most common types are HCC, which makes up 80% of cases and intrahepatic cholangiocarcinoma. The diagnosis may be supported by blood tests and medical imaging, with confirmation by tissue biopsy.

Given that there are many different causes of liver cancer, there are many approaches to liver cancer prevention. These efforts include immunization against hepatitis B, hepatitis B treatment, hepatitis C treatment, decreasing alcohol use, decreasing exposure to aflatoxin in agriculture, and management of obesity and diabetes. Hepatocellular carcinoma (HCC) linked to MASLD can develop even in the absence of cirrhosis, and it occurs more often than virus-induced liver cancers, although cirrhosis still stands as a predominant risk factor overall.

Screening is recommended in those with chronic liver disease. For example, it is recommended that people with chronic liver disease who are at risk for hepatocellular carcinoma be screened every 6 months using ultrasound imaging. As of 2026, clinical guidelines increasingly recommend risk-stratified surveillance for liver disease, incorporating factors such as etiology, stage of fibrosis, age, and comorbidities when determining surveillance strategies.

Because liver cancer is an umbrella term for many types of cancer, the signs and symptoms depend on what type of cancer is present. Symptoms can be vague and broad. Cholangiocarcinoma is associated with sweating, jaundice, abdominal pain, weight loss, and liver enlargement. Hepatocellular carcinoma is associated with abdominal mass, abdominal pain, vomiting, anemia, back pain, jaundice, itching, weight loss and fever.

Treatment options may include surgery, targeted therapy and radiation therapy. In certain cases, ablation therapy, embolization therapy or liver transplantation may be used.

== Classification ==
Liver cancer can come from the liver parenchyma as well as other structures within the liver such as the bile duct, blood vessels and immune cells There are many sub-types of liver cancer, the most common of which are described below.

=== Hepatocellular carcinoma ===
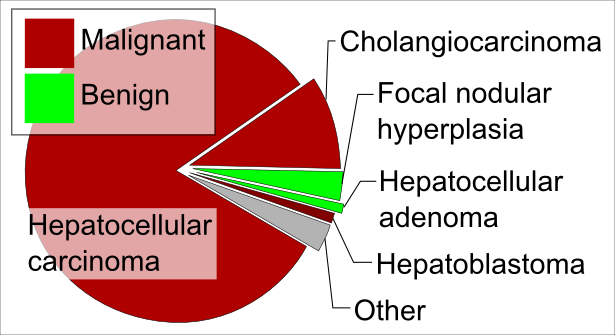
Liver tumor types by relative incidence in adults in the United States (liver cancers in dark red color).

The most frequent liver cancer, accounting for approximately 75% of all primary liver cancers, is hepatocellular carcinoma (HCC). HCC is a cancer formed by liver cells, known as hepatocytes, that become malignant. In terms of cancer deaths, worldwide HCC is considered the 3rd most common cause of cancer mortalities.

In terms of HCC diagnosis, it is recommended that people with risk factors (including known chronic liver disease, cirrhosis, etc.) should receive screening ultrasounds. If the ultrasound shows a focal area that is larger than 1 centimeter in size, patients should then get a triple-phase contrast-enhanced CT or MRI scan. HCC can then be diagnosed radiologically using the Liver Imaging Reporting and Data System (LI-RADS). There is also a variant type of HCC that consists of both HCC and cholangiocarcinoma.

=== Intrahepatic cholangiocarcinoma ===
Cancer of the bile duct (cholangiocarcinoma and cholangiocellular cystadenocarcinoma) account for approximately 6% of primary liver cancers. Intrahepatic cholangiocarcinoma (CCA) is an epithelial cancer of the intra-hepatic biliary tree branches. Intrahepatic CCA is the second leading cause of primary liver cancer. It is more common in men and usually is diagnosed in 60-70 year olds. Risk factors for development of intrahepatic CCA include opisthorchus viverrini infection, Clonorchis sinensis infection, sclerosing cholangitis, choledochal cysts, past procedures of the biliary tree, exposure to thorotrast and dioxins, and cirrhosis. This cancer is usually asymptomatic until the disease has progressed. Symptoms include abdominal pain, night sweats, weight loss, and fatigue. Liver markers that can be increased with intrahepatic CCA are carcinoembryonic antigen (CEA), CA19-9, and CA-125.

=== Angiosarcoma and hemangiosarcoma ===
These are rare and aggressive liver cancers, yet are the third most common primary liver cancer making up 0.1-2.0% of primary liver cancer. Angiosarcoma and hemangiosarcoma of the liver come from the blood vessel's endothelial layer. These tumors have poor outcomes because they grow rapidly and metastasise easily. They are also hard to diagnose but are typically suspected on CT or MRI scans that show focal lesions with differing amounts of signal intensity (these tumors have a lot of bleeding or hemorrhage and subsequent dying of tissue (necrosis)). Biopsy with histopathological evaluation yields the definitive diagnosis. While the cause is often never identified (75% are idiopathic), they are associated with exposures to substances such as vinyl chloride, arsenic, thorotrast (e.g. occupational exposure). Radiation is also a risk factor. In adults, these tumors are more common in males; however, in children they are more common in females.

Even with surgery, prognosis is poor with most individuals not living longer than six months after diagnosis. Only 3% of individuals live longer than two years.

=== Hepatoblastoma ===
Another type of cancer formed by liver cells is hepatoblastoma, which is specifically formed by immature liver cells. It is a rare malignant tumor that primarily develops in children, and accounts for approximately 1% of all cancers in children and 79% of all primary liver cancers under the age of 15. Most hepatoblastomas form in the right lobe.

=== Metastasis to liver ===
Many cancers found in the liver are not true liver cancers but are cancers from other sites in the body that have spread to the liver (known as metastases). Frequently, the site of origin is the gastrointestinal tract, since the liver is close to many of these metabolically active, blood-rich organs near to blood vessels and lymph nodes (such as pancreatic cancer, stomach cancer, colon cancer and carcinoid tumors mainly of the appendix), but also from breast cancer, ovarian cancer, lung cancer, renal cancer, prostate cancer.

=== Children ===
The Children's Oncology Group (COG) has developed a protocol to help diagnose and manage childhood liver tumors.

== Causes ==
=== Viral infection ===
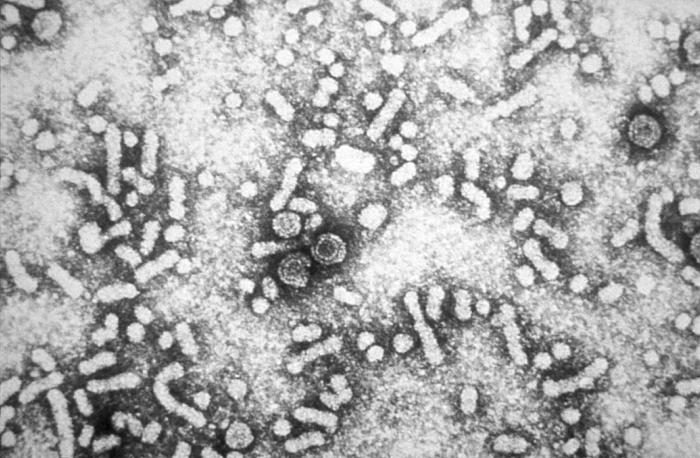
This electron micrograph shows hepatitis B virus "Dane particles", or virions.

Viral infection with hepatitis C virus (HCV) or Hepatitis B virus (HBV) is the chief cause of liver cancer in the world today, accounting for 80% of HCC. Men with chronic HCV or HBV are more likely to develop HCC than women with chronic HCV or HBV; however, the reasons for this gender difference is unknown. HBV infection is also linked to cholangiocarcinoma. The role of viruses other than HCV or HBV in liver cancer is much less clear, even though there is some evidence that co-infection of HBV and hepatitis D virus may increase the risk for HCC.

HBV and HCV can lead to HCC, because these viral infections cause massive inflammation, fibrosis, and eventual cirrhosis occurs within the liver. In addition, many genetic and epigenetic changes are formed in liver cells during HCV and HBV infection, which is a major factor in the production of the liver tumors. The viruses induce malignant changes in cells by altering gene methylation, affecting gene expression, and promoting or repressing cellular signal transduction pathways. By doing this, the viruses can prevent cells from undergoing a programmed form of cell death (apoptosis) and promote viral replication and persistence.

HBV and HCV also induce malignant changes by causing DNA damage and genomic instability. This involves the generation of reactive oxygen species, expression of proteins that interfere with DNA repair enzymes, and HCV induced activation of a mutator enzyme.

=== Cirrhosis ===
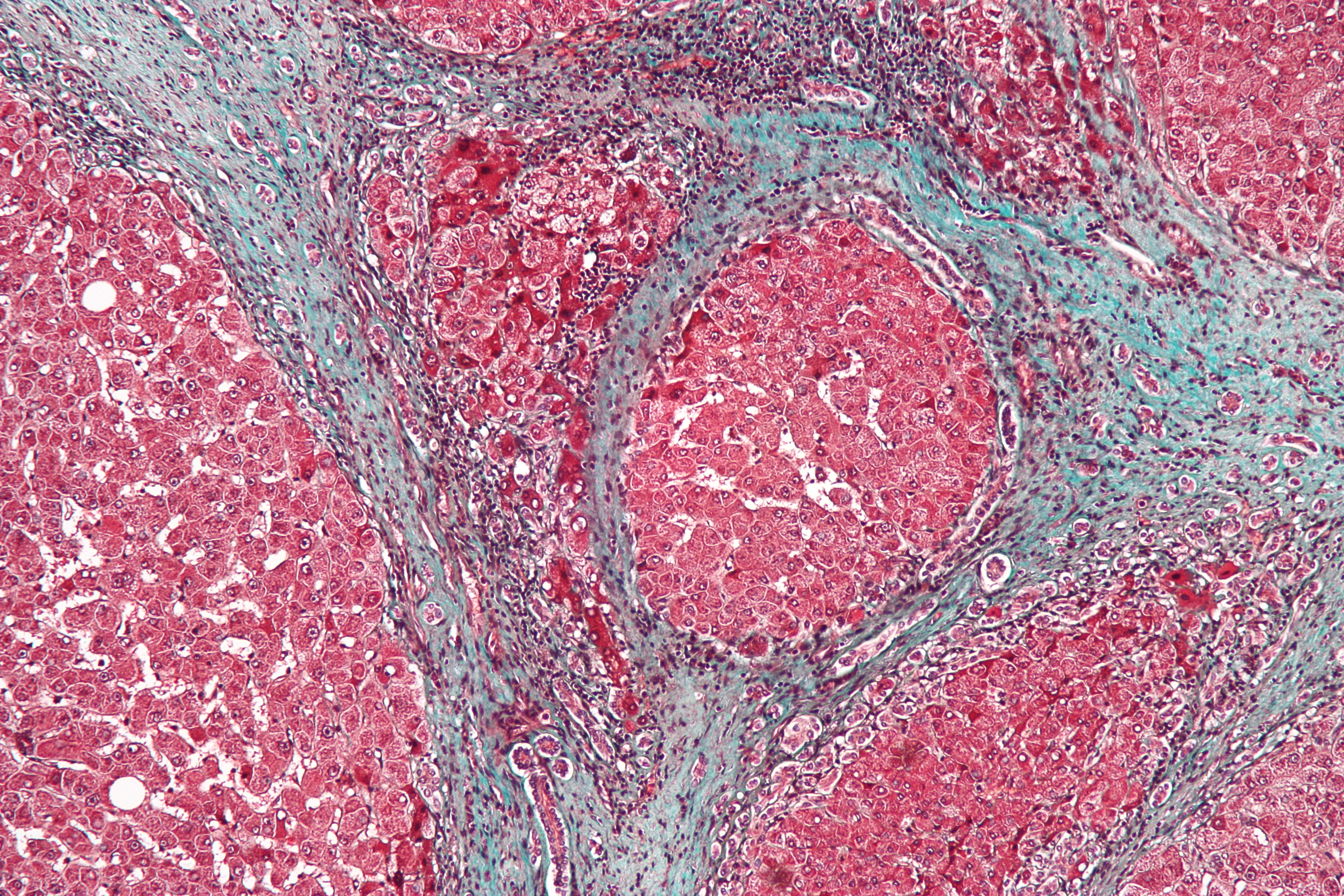
High magnification micrograph of a liver with cirrhosis. Trichrome stain. The most common cause of cirrhosis in the Western world is alcohol use disorder – the cause of cirrhosis in this case.

In addition to virus-related cirrhosis described above, other causes of cirrhosis can lead to HCC. Alcohol intake correlates with risk of HCC, and the risk is far greater in individuals with an alcohol-induced cirrhotic liver. There are a few disorders that are known to cause cirrhosis and lead to cancer, including hereditary hemochromatosis and primary biliary cirrhosis.

=== Aflatoxin ===
Aflatoxin exposure can lead to the development of HCC. The aflatoxins are a group of chemicals produced by the fungi Aspergillus flavus (the name comes from A. flavus toxin) and A. parasiticus. Food contamination by the fungi leads to ingestion of the chemicals, which are very toxic to the liver. Common foodstuffs contaminated with the toxins are cereals, peanuts, and other vegetables. The amount (dose) and how long (duration) that a person is in contact with aflatoxin is associated with HCC. Contamination of food is common in Africa, South-East Asia, and China. The mechanism by which aflatoxins cause cancer is through mutations and epigenetic alterations. Aflatoxins induce a spectrum of mutations, including in the p53 tumor suppressor gene, which is a mutation seen in many types of cancers. Mutation in p53, presumably in conjunction with other aflatoxin-induced mutations and epigenetic alterations, is likely a common cause of aflatoxin-induced carcinogenesis.

=== Nonalcoholic steatohepatitis (NASH) and Nonalcoholic fatty liver (NAFL) ===
NASH and NAFL is beginning to be called a risk factor for liver cancer, particularly HCC. In recent years, there has been a noted increase in liver transplantations for HCC that was attributable to NASH. More research is needed in this area and NASH/NAFL.

=== Other risk factors in adults ===
- High grade dysplastic nodules are precancerous lesions of the liver. Within two years, there is a risk for cancer arising from these nodules of 30–40%.
- Obesity and metabolic syndrome have emerged as an important risk factor, as they can lead to steatohepatitis.
- Diabetes increases the risk for HCC.
- Smoking increases the risk for HCC compared to non-smokers and previous smokers.
- There is around 5-10% lifetime risk of cholangiocarcinoma in people with primary sclerosing cholangitis.
- Liver fluke infection increases the risk for cholangiocarcinoma, and this is the reason why Thailand has particularly high rates of this cancer.
- Choledochal cysts, Caroli's disease, and congenital hepatic fibrosis are associated with cholangiocarcinoma development.
- Genetic conditions: untreated hereditary hemochromatosis, alpha-1-antitrypsin deficiency, glycogen storage diseases, porphyria cutanea tarda, Wilson's disease, tyrosinemia have all been associated with development of HCC.
- Oral contraceptive pill: There is insufficient evidence to label oral contraceptives as a risk factor. However, recent studies have found that taking oral contraceptives for longer than five years is associated with HCC.

=== Children ===
Childhood liver cancer is uncommon. The liver cancer sub-types most commonly seen in children are hepatoblastoma, hepatocellular carcinoma, embryomal sarcoma of liver, infantile choriocarcinoma of liver, and biliary rhabdomyosarcoma. Increased risk for liver cancer in children can be caused by Beckwith–Wiedemann syndrome (associated with hepatoblastoma), familial adenomatous polyposis (associated with hepatoblastoma), low birth weight (associated with hepatoblastoma), Progressive familial intrahepatic cholestasis (associated with HCC) and Trisomy 18 (associated with hepatoblastoma).

== Diagnosis ==
Many imaging modalities are used to aid in the diagnosis of liver cancer. For HCC these include medical ultrasound, computed tomography (CT) and magnetic resonance imaging (MRI). When imaging the liver with ultrasound, large lesions are likely to be HCC (e.g., a mass greater than 2 cm has more than 95% chance of being HCC).Given the blood flow to the liver, HCC would be most visible when the contrast flows through the arteries of the liver (also called the arterial phase) rather than when the contrast flows through the veins (also called the venous phase). Sometimes doctors will get a liver biopsy, if they are worried about HCC and the imaging studies (CT or MRI) do not have clear results. It usually is necessary for a liver biopsy to be taken in order for a diagnosis. During the procedure of a liver biopsy, the doctor will insert a needle into the liver to gather a sample. The sample is then taken to the lab to look for the cancer cells within the tissue. The majority of cholangiocarcimas occur in the hilar region of the liver, and often present as bile duct obstruction. If the cause of obstruction is suspected to be malignant, endoscopic retrograde cholangiopancreatography (ERCP), ultrasound, CT, MRI and magnetic resonance cholangiopancreatography (MRCP) are used. Detecting HCC at its earliest stage, specifically when there is only a single tumor under 2 cm, is associated with 3.7 years of life lost. However, if the diagnosis occurs later—either with a single tumor of $\ge 2$ cm or with two to three nodules that still fit the Milan criteria—the impact on life expectancy increases to 5.0 years of life lost.

Tumor markers, chemicals sometimes found in the blood of people with cancer, can be helpful in diagnosing and monitoring the course of liver cancers. High levels of alpha-fetoprotein (AFP) in the blood can be found in many cases of HCC and intrahepatic cholangiocarcinoma. Of note, AFP is most useful for monitoring if liver cancers come back after treatment rather than for initial diagnosis. Cholangiocarcinoma can be detected with these commonly used tumor markers: carbohydrate antigen 19-9 (CA 19–9), carcinoembryonic antigen (CEA) and cancer antigen 125 (CA125). These tumor markers are found in primary liver cancers, as well as in other cancers and certain other disorders.

== Prevention ==
Prevention of cancers can be separated into primary, secondary, and tertiary prevention. Primary prevention preemptively reduces exposure to a risk factor for liver cancer. One of the most successful primary liver cancer preventions is vaccination against hepatitis B. Vaccination against the hepatitis C virus is currently unavailable. Other forms of primary prevention are aimed at limiting transmission of these viruses by promoting safe injection practices, screening blood donation products, and screening high-risk asymptomatic individuals. Aflatoxin exposure can be avoided by post-harvest intervention to discourage mold, which has been effective in west Africa. Reducing alcohol use disorder, obesity, and diabetes mellitus would also reduce rates of liver cancer. Diet control in hemochromatosis could decrease the risk of iron overload, decreasing the risk of cancer.

Due to the increasing incidence of MASLD on a global scale, prevention strategies now place greater emphasis on managing weight, promoting physical activity, controlling diabetes, and reducing metabolic risk factors, in addition to continuing efforts to prevent viral hepatitis. These measures aim to curb the rising trend of liver diseases associated with metabolic dysfunction.

Secondary prevention includes both cure of the agent involved in the formation of cancer (carcinogenesis) and the prevention of carcinogenesis if this is not possible. Cure of virus-infected individuals is not possible, but treatment with antiviral drugs can decrease the risk of liver cancer. Chlorophyllin may have potential in reducing the effects of aflatoxin.

Tertiary prevention includes treatments to prevent the recurrence of liver cancer. These include the use of surgical interventions, chemotherapy drugs, and antiviral drugs.

== Treatment ==
=== General considerations ===
Like many cancers, treatment depends on the specific type of liver cancer as well as stage of the cancer. The main way cancer is staged is based on the TMN staging systems. There are also liver cancer specific staging systems, each of which has treatment options that may result in a non recurrence of cancer, or cure. For example, for HCC it is common to use the Barcelona Clinic Liver Cancer Staging System.

Treatments include surgery, medications, and ablation methods. There are many chemotherapeutic drugs approved for liver cancer including: atezolizumab, nivolumab, pembrolizumab, regorafenib. Increasingly, immunotherapy agents (also called targeted cancer therapies or precision medicine) are being used to treat hepatobiliary cancers. A standard first-line systemic treatment for advanced hepatocellular carcinoma now includes combination immune checkpoint inhibitor therapy. It has replaced tyrosine kinase inhibitor monotherapy as the preferred approach in eligible patients.

Recent advances in liver cancer treatment are exploring T cells engineered with chimeric antigen receptors (CARs) targeting glypican-3 (GPC3), such as GAP T cells, showing potential in addressing GPC3-positive tumors, especially in pediatric liver cancers.

New researches focus on blood-based biomarkers, circulating tumor DNA, artificial intelligence-assisted imaging, and combination immunotherapy strategies to enhance early detection and treatment options. However, most of these methods are still under clinical evaluation and have not yet been adopted as standard clinical practice.

=== Hepatocellular carcinoma ===
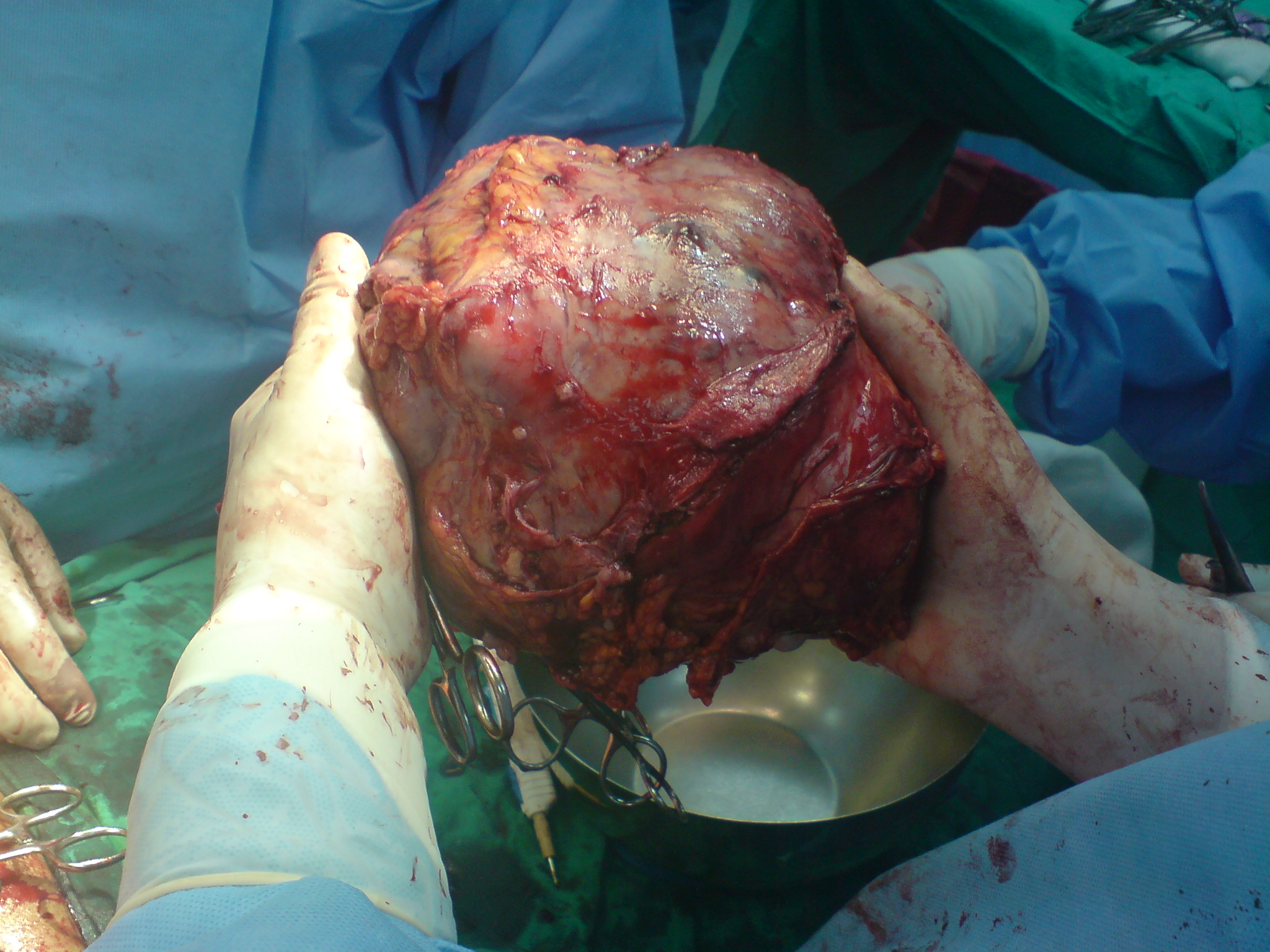
Left lobe liver tumor in a 50-year-old male, operated in King Saud Medical Complex, Riyadh, Saudi Arabia

Partial surgical resection is the recommended treatment for hepatocellular carcinoma (HCC) when patients have sufficient hepatic function reserve. 5-year survival rates after resection have massively improved over the last few decades and can now range from 41 to 74%. However, recurrence rates after resection can exceed 70%, whether due to spread of the initial tumor or formation of new tumors. Liver transplantation continues to be a viable curative option for carefully chosen patients with hepatocellular carcinoma and underlying liver disease. Adhering to the Milan criteria remains prevalent, although some transplant centers also apply expanded criteria for certain patients, ensuring favorable long-term outcomes. Current guidelines advocate for personalized assessments conducted by multidisciplinary transplant teams, emphasizing the importance of comprehensive patient evaluation.

Surgical resection remains the preferred curative treatment for early-stage hepatocellular carcinoma patients with preserved liver function and an adequate future liver remnant. Following the surgery, improvements in the preoperative care, patient selection, and multidisciplinary management have led to enhanced long-term survival rates. International guidelines continue to advocate for treatment decisions being made by multidisciplinary tumor boards comprising hepatologists, surgeons, oncologists, radiologists, and transplant specialists.

Systemic therapy for advanced hepatocellular carcinoma has seen significant advancements over the past decade. Immune checkpoint inhibitor-based combination therapies are now the preferred first-line treatment for most patients with unresectable disease, with regimens like atezolizumab plus bevacizumab and durvalumab plus tremelimumab being recommended for eligible patients. Tyrosine kinase inhibitors such as sorafenib and lenvatinib continue to serve as crucial alternatives for patients who are unsuitable for immunotherapy or post-progression scenarios.

Percutaneous ablation is the only non-surgical treatment that can offer cure. There are many forms of percutaneous ablation, which consist of either injecting chemicals into the liver (ethanol or acetic acid) or producing extremes of temperature using radio frequency ablation, microwaves, lasers or cryotherapy. Of these, radio frequency ablation has one of the best reputations in HCC, but the limitations include inability to treat tumors close to other organs and blood vessels due to heat generation and the heat sink effect, respectively. In addition, long-term of outcomes of percutaneous ablation procedures for HCC have not been well studied. In general, surgery is the preferred treatment modality when possible.

Systemic chemotherapeutics are not routinely used in HCC, although local chemotherapy may be used in a procedure known as transarterial chemoembolization. In this procedure, drugs that kill cancer cells and interrupt the blood supply are applied to the tumor. Because most systemic drugs have no efficacy in the treatment of HCC, research into the molecular pathways involved in the production of liver cancer produced sorafenib, a targeted therapy drug that prevents cell proliferation and blood cell growth. Sorafenib obtained FDA approval for the treatment of advanced hepatocellular carcinoma in November 2007. This drug provides a survival benefit for advanced HCC. When introduced, sorafenib marked a significant milestone in systemic therapy for advanced hepatocellular carcinoma, but recent clinical trials have shown that immune checkpoint inhibitor-based combination therapies offer superior survival benefits. As a result, international clinical practice guidelines now prioritize these combination therapies as the first-line treatment for most eligible patients with advanced hepatocellular carcinoma. Despite this shift, tyrosine kinase inhibitors like sorafenib and lenvatinib still play a vital role for patients who cannot receive immunotherapy or following disease progression.

In high-risk patients, adjuvant immunotherapy has shown promising results for reducing recurrence after curative resection or ablation. The phase III IMbrave050 trial indicated that atezolizumab plus bevacizumab improved recurrence-free survival compared to active surveillance in patients at initial analysis. However, longer-term follow-up has led to continued evaluation of its efficacy and safety profile in routine clinical practice.

As of 2026, patients with unresectable hepatocellular carcinoma are advised to receive immune checkpoint inhibitor-based combinations, such as anti-PD-(L)1 agents combined with anti-VEGF therapy or dual immune checkpoint blockade, as the preferred first-line systemic treatment option by the international treatment guidelines. For those unsuitable for immunotherapy or after disease progression, tyrosine kinase inhibitors remain a significant choice.

Transarterial radioembolization (TRACE) is another option for HCC. In this procedure, radiation treatment is targeted at the tumor. TRACE is still considered an add on treatment rather than the first choice for treatment of HCC, as dual treatments of radiotherapy plus chemoembolization, local chemotherapy, systemic chemotherapy or targeted therapy drugs may show benefit over radiotherapy alone.

Thermal ablation, which includes both radiofrequency ablation and microwave ablation, is an important part of the hepatocellular carcinoma treatment landscape for small tumors in non-surgical candidates. Microwave ablation is widely adopted due to its advantages over radiofrequency ablation in producing larger and more uniform ablation zones, making it less prone to the heat-sink effect in certain clinical scenarios.

Locoregional therapies, including transarterial chemoembolization, transarterial radioembolization, external beam radiotherapy, and stereotactic body radiotherapy, are crucial for managing intermediate-stage hepatocellular carcinoma or for patients unsuitable for curative treatments, offering targeted and often palliative benefits.

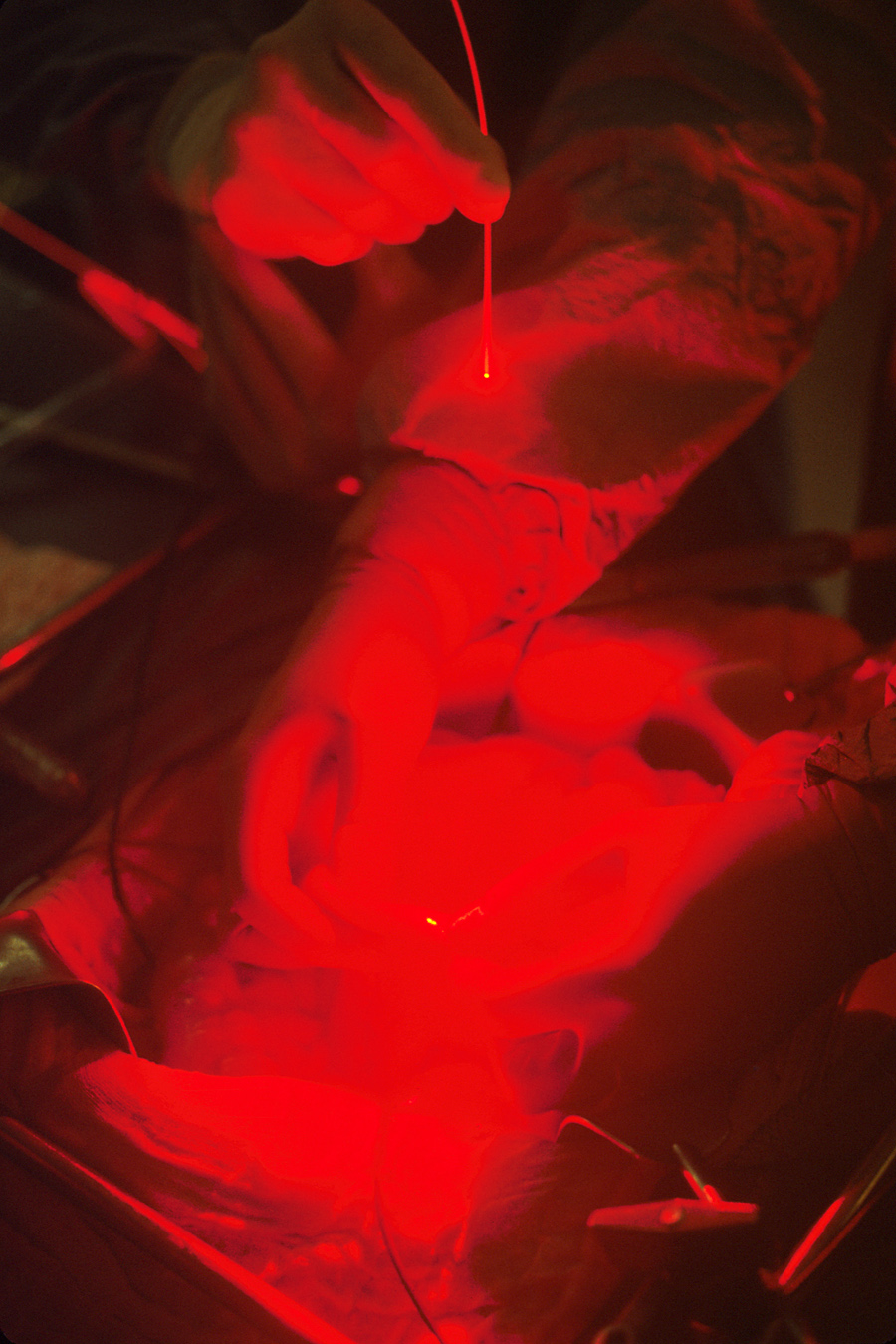
A surgeon performing photodynamic therapy

=== Intrahepatic cholangiocarcinoma ===
Resection is an option in cholangiocarcinoma, but fewer than 30% of cases of cholangiocarcinoma are resectable at diagnosis. The reason the majority of intrahepatic cholangiocarcinomas are not able to be surgically removed is because there are often multiple focal tumors within the liver. After surgery, recurrence rates are up to 60%. Liver transplant may be used where partial resection is not an option, and adjuvant chemoradiation may benefit some cases.

60% of cholangiocarcinomas form in the perihilar region and photodynamic therapy can be used to improve quality of life and survival time in these un-resectable cases. Photodynamic therapy is a novel treatment that uses light activated molecules to treat the tumor. The compounds are activated in the tumor region by laser light, which causes the release of toxic reactive oxygen species, killing tumor cells.

Systemic chemotherapies such as gemcitabine and cisplatin are sometimes used in inoperable cases of cholangiocarcinoma.

Radio frequency ablation, transarterial chemoembolization and internal radiotherapy (brachytherapy) all show promise in the treatment of cholangiocarcinoma and can sometimes improve bile flow, which can decrease the symptoms a patient experiences.

Radiotherapy may be used in the adjuvant setting or for palliative treatment of cholangiocarcinoma.

=== Hepatoblastoma ===
Removing the tumor by either surgical resection or liver transplant can be used in the treatment of hepatoblastoma. In some cases surgery can offer a cure. Chemotherapy may be used before and after surgery and transplant.

Chemotherapy, including cisplatin, vincristine, cyclophosphamide, and doxorubicin are used for the systemic treatment of hepatoblastoma. Out of these drugs, cisplatin seems to be the most effective.

==== Angiosarcoma and hemangiosarcoma ====
Many of these tumors end up not being amenable to surgical treatment. Treatment options include surgically removing parts of the liver that are affected. Liver transplantation and chemotherapy are not effective for angiosarcomas and hemangiosarcomas of the liver.

== Epidemiology ==
Liver cancer death rate

Globally, liver cancer is common and increasing. Most recent epidemiological data suggests that liver cancer is in the Top 10 for both prevalence and mortality (noted to be the sixth-leading cause of cancer and fourth most-common cause of death). The Global Burden of Disease Liver Cancer Collaboration found that from 1990 to 2015 the new cases of liver cancer per year increased by 75%. Estimates based on most recent data suggest that each year there are 841,000 new liver cancer diagnoses and 782,000 deaths across the globe. Liver cancer is the most common cancer in Egypt, the Gambia, Guinea, Mongolia, Cambodia, and Vietnam. In terms of gender breakdown, globally liver cancer is more common in men than in women.

Given that HCC is the most-common type of liver cancer, the areas around the world with the most new cases of HCC each year are Northern and Western Africa as well as Eastern and South-Eastern Asia. China has 50% of HCC cases globally, and more than 80% of total cases occur in sub-Saharan Africa or in East-Asia due to hepatitis B virus. In these high disease burden areas, evidence indicates the majority of the HBC and HCV infections occur via perinatal transmission (also called mother-to-child transmission). However, the risk factors for HCC varies by geographic region. For example, in China, chronic HBV infection and aflatoxin are the largest risk factors; whereas, in Mongolia, it is a combination of HBV and HCV co-infection and high levels of alcohol use that are driving the high levels of HCC.

In terms of intrahepatic cholangiocarcinoma, we currently do not have sufficient epidemiological data because it is a rare cancer. According to the United States National Cancer Institute, the incidence of cholangiocarcinoma is not known. Cholangiocarcinoma also has a significant geographical distribution, with Thailand showing the highest rates worldwide due to the presence of liver fluke.

In the United States, there were 42,810 new cases of liver and intrahepatic bile duct cancer in 2020, which represents 2.4% of all new cancer cases in the United States. There are about 89.950 people who have liver and intrahepatic liver cancer in the United States. In terms of mortality, the 5-year survival rate for liver and intrahepatic bile duct cancers in the United States is 19.6%. In the United States, there is an estimated 1% chance of getting liver cancer across the lifespan, which makes this cancer relatively rare. Despite the low number of cases, it is one of the top causes of cancer deaths.

A study by The Lancet published in July 2025 stated that cases of liver cancer could almost double by 2050, rising to 1.52 million a year, if current trends are to continue.
