= Vanishing bile duct syndrome =

- Other names: Ductopenia
- Specialty: Gastroenterology

Vanishing bile duct syndrome is a loose collection of diseases leading to hepatic bile duct injury and eventual ductopenia.

== Signs and symptoms ==
The presentation is dependent upon the underlying cause. The course can be rapid or chronic.

- Fatigue
- Anorexia
- Abdominal pain
- Weight loss
- Pruritus
- Hyperlipidemia
- Malabsorption
- Fat-soluble vitamin deficiencies
- Elevated alkaline phosphatase
- Elevated gamma-glutamyltransferase
- Elevated conjugated bilirubin

== Cause ==
=== Congenital ===
In fetal and neonatal life, the ductal plates are remodeled. The malformations can be atretic or fibrocystic.

==== Atretic causes ====
- Intrahepatic bile duct atresia (Alagille syndrome) (ALGS2 MIM:610205 and ALGS1 MIM:118450)
- Extrahepatic bile duct atresia

==== Fibrocystic causes ====
- Autosomal recessive polycystic kidney disease
- Congenital hepatic fibrosis
- Caroli's disease
- Von Meyenburg complex

==== Chromosomal associations ====
- Trisomy 17, 18 and 21

==== Genetic associations ====
- Cystic fibrosis
- Alpha 1 antitrypsin deficiency
- Trihydroxycoprostanic acidemia
- Byler's disease

=== Immunologic associations ===
Bile duct injury and loss can result from autoimmune destruction. T cells recognize biliary epithelial cell antigens causing injury and eventual atresia.

=== Other causes ===
- Primary biliary cirrhosis
- Primary sclerosing cholangitis
- Hodgkin's lymphoma
- Chronic graft-versus-host disease
- Drugs(chlorpromazine)/Toxins
- Ischemia

== Treatment ==
Treatment is dependent upon the underlying cause. Treatment is supportive as it is not possible to induce regrowth of lost ducts.

=== Medical therapies ===
- Ursodeoxycholic acid
- Immunosuppression
  - General consensus is that more studies are needed before this can be considered
- Organ transplant
