= Flavocoxid =

Flavocoxid is a medical food consisting of plant derived flavonoids which have anti-inflammatory activity and are used to provide nutritional support to people with chronic osteoarthritis.

Flavocoxid has been approved for use as a medical food in the United States since 2004 and is available by prescription for use in chronic osteoarthritis in tablets of 500 mg under the commercial name Limbrel.

Flavocoxid has been linked to occasional minor elevations in serum enzyme levels during therapy and to rare instances of clinically apparent liver injury.

== Hepatotoxicity ==
In clinical trials, serum aminotransferase elevations occurred in up to 10% of patients on flavocoxid therapy, but elevations above 3 times the upper limit of normal occurred in only 1% to 2% of recipients. However, there have been several reports of clinically apparent acute liver injury attributed to flavocoxid. Most cases have occurred in women (who are more likely to take flavocoxid). The time to onset has been 1 to 5 months and the pattern of enzyme elevations was usually hepatocellular or mixed. Most cases have been moderate in severity and no instance of acute liver failure or death has been reported. Complete resolution upon stopping flavocoxid has occurred in 2 to 12 weeks. Immunoallergic features have been mild and autoantibodies are not common. At least one instance of recurrence upon rechallenge has been reported.

== Mechanism of Injury ==
Flavocoxid is a proprietary mixture of molecules extracted from plants and it is unclear which component(s) might be responsible for liver injury. The mixture includes extracts from Scutellaria baicalensis (containing the phytochemical baicalin) and Acacia catechu (catechin)), both of which have been implicated in causing idiosyncratic acute liver injury, but the mechanism is unknown.

== Outcome and management ==
No instances of acute liver failure or chronic liver injury have been linked to flavocoxid use and all cases have been self-limited, without subsequent chronic hepatitis or vanishing bile duct syndrome. Recurrence upon re-exposure has been reported and rechallenge should be avoided. There is no information on possible cross sensitivity of hepatic injury with other medications or herbal agents such as skull cap or green tea.

== See also ==
- Arachidonate 5-lipoxygenase
