= PRKCSH =

Protein-coding gene in the species Homo sapiens

Identifiers
- Aliases: PRKCSH, AGE-R2, G19P1, PCLD, PKCSH, PLD1, GIIB, VASAP-60, protein kinase C substrate 80K-H, PCLD1
- External IDs: OMIM: 177060; MGI: 107877; GeneCards: PRKCSH

Gene location (Human)
Chr.	Chromosome 19 (human)
Band	19p13.2	Start	11,435,284 bp
Band	19p13.2	End	11,450,968 bp

Gene location (Mouse)
Chr.	Chromosome 9 (mouse)
Band	9 A3|9 8.04 cM	Start	21,914,102 bp
Band	9 A3|9 8.04 cM	End	21,925,518 bp
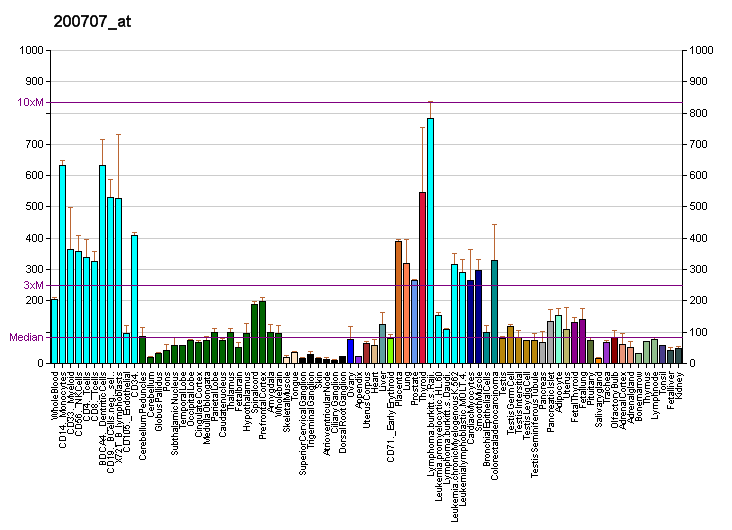

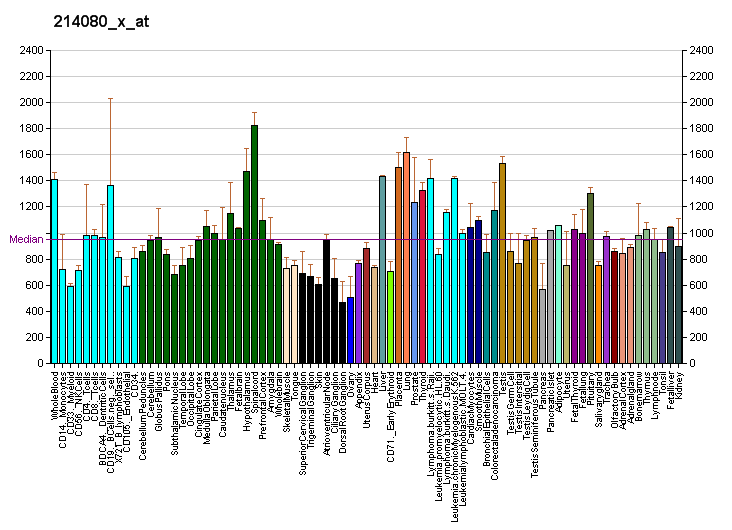
RNA expression pattern
Bgee	Human / Mouse (ortholog); Top expressed in: stromal cell of endometrium; beta cell; olfactory bulb; left ovary; right ovary; C1 segment; granulocyte; right uterine tube; body of pancreas; body of uterus / Top expressed in: choroid plexus of fourth ventricle; saccule; yolk sac; gastrula; calvaria; otic vesicle; epiblast; right kidney; decidua; somite; More reference expression data
BioGPS	More reference expression data
Gene ontology
Molecular function	calcium ion binding; phosphoprotein binding; transmembrane transporter binding; metal ion binding; protein kinase C binding; protein binding
Cellular component	endoplasmic reticulum lumen; intracellular anatomical structure; endoplasmic reticulum; glucosidase II complex; intracellular membrane-bounded organelle
Biological process	N-glycan processing; intracellular signal transduction; post-translational protein modification; protein folding
Sources:Amigo / QuickGO
Orthologs
Databases	NCBI: entry; OMA: entry
Species	Human	Mouse
Entrez	5589	19089
Ensembl	ENSG00000130175	ENSMUSG00000003402
UniProt	P14314	O08795
RefSeq (mRNA)	NM_001001329; NM_001289102; NM_001289103; NM_001289104; NM_002743 NM_001379608; NM_001379609	NM_001293650; NM_001293651; NM_008925
RefSeq (protein)	NP_001001329; NP_001276031; NP_001276032; NP_001276033; NP_002734 NP_001366537; NP_001366538	NP_001280579; NP_001280580; NP_032951
Location (UCSC)	Chr 19: 11.44 – 11.45 Mb	Chr 9: 21.91 – 21.93 Mb
PubMed search
- Wikidata
View/Edit Human	View/Edit Mouse

Glucosidase 2 subunit beta is an enzyme that in humans is encoded by the PRKCSH gene.

This gene encodes the beta-subunit of glucosidase II, an N-linked glycan-processing enzyme in the endoplasmic reticulum (ER). This protein is an acidic phospho-protein known to be a substrate for protein kinase C. Mutations in this gene have been associated with the autosomal dominant polycystic liver disease (PCLD). Alternatively spliced transcript variants encoding distinct isoforms have been observed.
