= Ductopenia =

Ductopenia refers to a reduction in the number of ducts in an organ, in particular the absence of bile ducts of the expected size in the portal tract of the liver. It is the histological hallmark of vanishing bile duct syndrome (typically <0.5 bile ducts per portal triad). The most common cause of ductopenia is primary biliary cholangitis.

Other causes of ductopenia include failing liver transplant, Hodgkin's lymphoma, graft-versus-host disease (GVHD), sarcoid, cytomegalovirus infection, HIV, and medication toxicity, such as phenothiazines.
