= Hanns von Meyenburg =

Swiss pathologist (1887–1971)

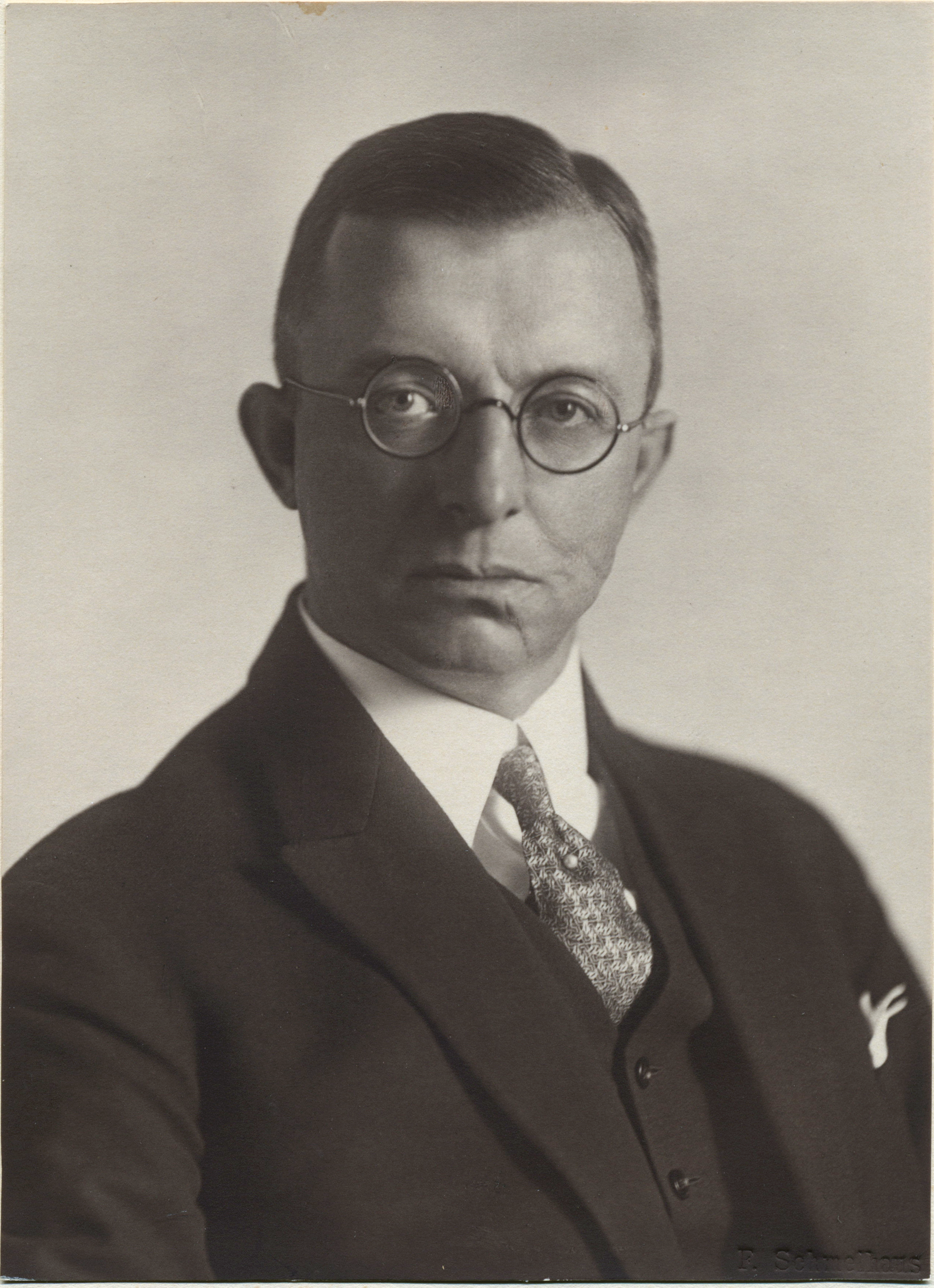
photo of Hanns von Meyenburg

Hanns von Meyenburg (actually Walter but called Hanns; 6 June 1887, in Dresden – 6 November 1971) was a Swiss pathologist.

== Biography ==
Hanns von Meyenburg was the son of Swiss sculptor Victor von Meyenburg (1834–1893) and his wife Konstanze von May, which belong to the Schaffhausen nobility.

He was born in Dresden, where his father had lived since 1869, but returned to his parents' land of origin for his studies and his career. He did his habilitation in 1918 with Otto Busse and became a professor in 1919 at the University of Lausanne. From 1925 to 1953, he was professor at the University of Zürich. From 1932 to 1934, he was Dean of the Faculty of Medicine, and from 1934 to 1936 Rector of the University of Zürich.

The von Meyenburg complex, in liver histopathology, in named after him.

His daughter Gertrud Frisch-von Meyenburg was married from 1943 to 1960 with architect Max Frisch.

== Selected works ==
- Der Schaffhauser Arzt und Postmeister Johann Jakob v. Meyenburg, 1665–1717, und seine Beziehungen zu den Grafen Montfort und Schönborn: ein Kulturbild nach Briefen. Verlag Schaffhauser Nachrichten, Schaffhausen 1960.
- Die Schipf in Herrliberg: Chronik eines Landgutes am Zürichsee. Verlag Berichthaus, Zürich 1957.
- Kurze Anleitung zur Vornahme von Sektionen. Zürich 1940.
- Medizinstudium und Universität: Festrede des Rektors, gehalten an der 102. Stiftungsfeier der Universität Zürich am 29. April 1934. Zürich 1935.
- Form und Funktion: Festrede des Rektors, gehalten an der 101. Stiftungsfeier der Universität Zürich am 28. April 1934. Orell Füssli, Zürich 1934.
- Über die Cystenleber. Fischer, Jena 1918.
- Kasuistische Beiträge zur Frage der Arthritis deformans juvenilis idiopathica. Zürich 1914. (Dissertation)

== Literature ==
- Erwin Uehlinger: In memoriam Hanns von Meyenburg. In: Verhandlungen der Deutschen Gesellschaft für Pathologie. 56. Tagung, 1972, S. 697–701.
