= Congenital hepatic fibrosis =

- Congenital hepatic fibrosis has an autosomal recessive pattern of inheritance.
- Specialty: Gasteroenterology

Congenital hepatic fibrosis is an inherited fibrocystic liver disease associated with proliferation of interlobular bile ducts within the portal areas and fibrosis that do not alter hepatic lobular architecture. The fibrosis would affect resistance in portal veins leading to portal hypertension.

== Cause ==
The condition is usually congenital, but sporadic cases have also been reported. It may be associated with other congenital defects, commonly with autosomal recessive polycystic kidney disease, the most severe form of PKD. Some suggest that these two conditions are one disorder with different presentation.

== Mechanism ==
Embryogenically, congenital hepatic fibrosis is due to malformation of the duct plate, a round structure appearing in the eighth week of gestation that is formed by primitive hepatocytes, which differentiate into cholangiocytes. Congenital hepatic fibrosis usually presents in adolescent or young adulthood, but onset of signs and symptoms can range from early childhood through mid-life. Clinical features may vary but commonly include cholangitis, hepatomegaly and signs of portal hypertension.

== Diagnosis ==
Liver biopsy is diagnostic. In biopsy there is diffuse periportal and perilobular fibrosis in broad bands, containing distorted duct like structure or microcyst formation.

== Management ==
Management includes control of esophageal bleeding/varices and treatment of associated renal disease if present.

== See also ==
- Caroli disease
- Polycystic kidney disease
- Von Meyenburg complex
- Biliary hamartomas
