= Cholangitis (disambiguation) =

Cholangitis is any inflammation of the biliary tree, including:

- Ascending cholangitis, a severe acute bacterial infection associated with gallstones in the common bile duct
- Primary sclerosing cholangitis, a chronic autoimmune disease leading to liver failure
- Secondary sclerosing cholangitis, an umbrella term for other unrelated medical conditions that cause sclerosis of the bile ducts
