= Polycystic liver disease =

Genetic disease of cysts in the liver

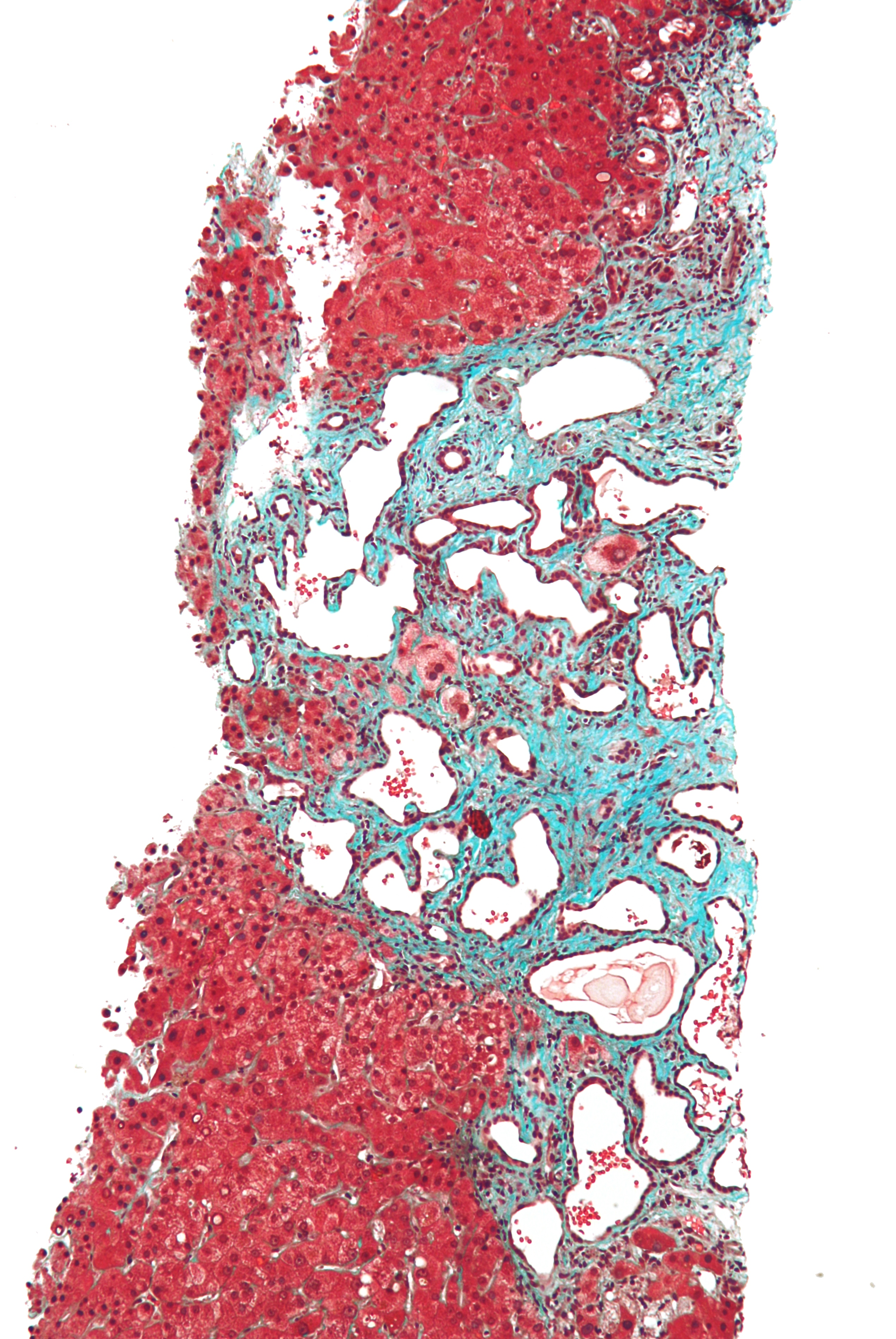
- Micrograph showing a von Meyenburg complex, a bile duct hamartoma associated with polycystic liver disease. Trichrome stain.
- Specialty: Medical genetics

Polycystic liver disease (PLD) usually describes the presence of multiple cysts scattered throughout normal liver tissue. PLD is commonly seen in association with autosomal-dominant polycystic kidney disease, with a prevalence of 1 in 400 to 1000, and accounts for 8–10% of all cases of end-stage renal disease. The much rarer autosomal-dominant polycystic liver disease will progress without any kidney involvement.

== Presentation ==
Polycystic liver disease is often asymptomatic and discovered incidentally during imaging. About 80-90% of individuals do not experience symptoms. When symptoms occur, they are usually related to the size and number of liver cysts causing pressure on nearby organs.

Common symptoms include abdominal distension, right upper quadrant discomfort, early satiety, heartburn, and shortness of breath. In more severe cases, patients may develop complications such as portal hypertension, bile duct obstruction (leading to jaundice), or inferior vena cava compression.

Acute complications like cyst hemorrhage, infection, or rupture are rare but can cause sudden pain, fever, or other signs of inflammation. Liver function tests are often normal, though mild elevations in alkaline phosphatase or GGT may be seen. Imaging, especially CT or MRI, is key for diagnosis and shows multiple cysts throughout the liver.

== Pathophysiology ==
Associations with PRKCSH and SEC63 have been described. Polycystic liver disease comes in two forms: autosomal dominant polycystic kidney disease (with kidney cysts) and autosomal dominant polycystic liver disease (liver cysts only).

== Diagnosis ==
Most patients with PLD are asymptomatic with simple cysts found following routine investigations. After confirming the presence of cysts in the liver, laboratory tests may be ordered to check for liver function including bilirubin, alkaline phosphatase, alanine aminotransferase, and prothrombin time.

Patients with PLD often have an enlarged liver which will compress adjacent organs, leading to nausea, respiratory issues, and limited physical ability. Classification of the progression of the disease takes into consideration the amount of remaining liver parenchyma compared to the amount and size of cysts.

Polycystic liver disease can exist either as isolated polycystic liver disease (PCLD), part of autosomal dominant polycystic kidney disease (ADPKD), or autosomal recessive polycystic kidney disease (ARPKD).

== Treatment ==
Many patients are asymptomatic and thus are not candidates for surgery. For patients with pain or complications from the cysts, the goal of treatment is to reduce the size of cysts while protecting the functioning liver parenchyma.

Cysts may be removed surgically or by using aspiration sclerotherapy.
