= Otto Busse =

German pathologist (1867–1922)

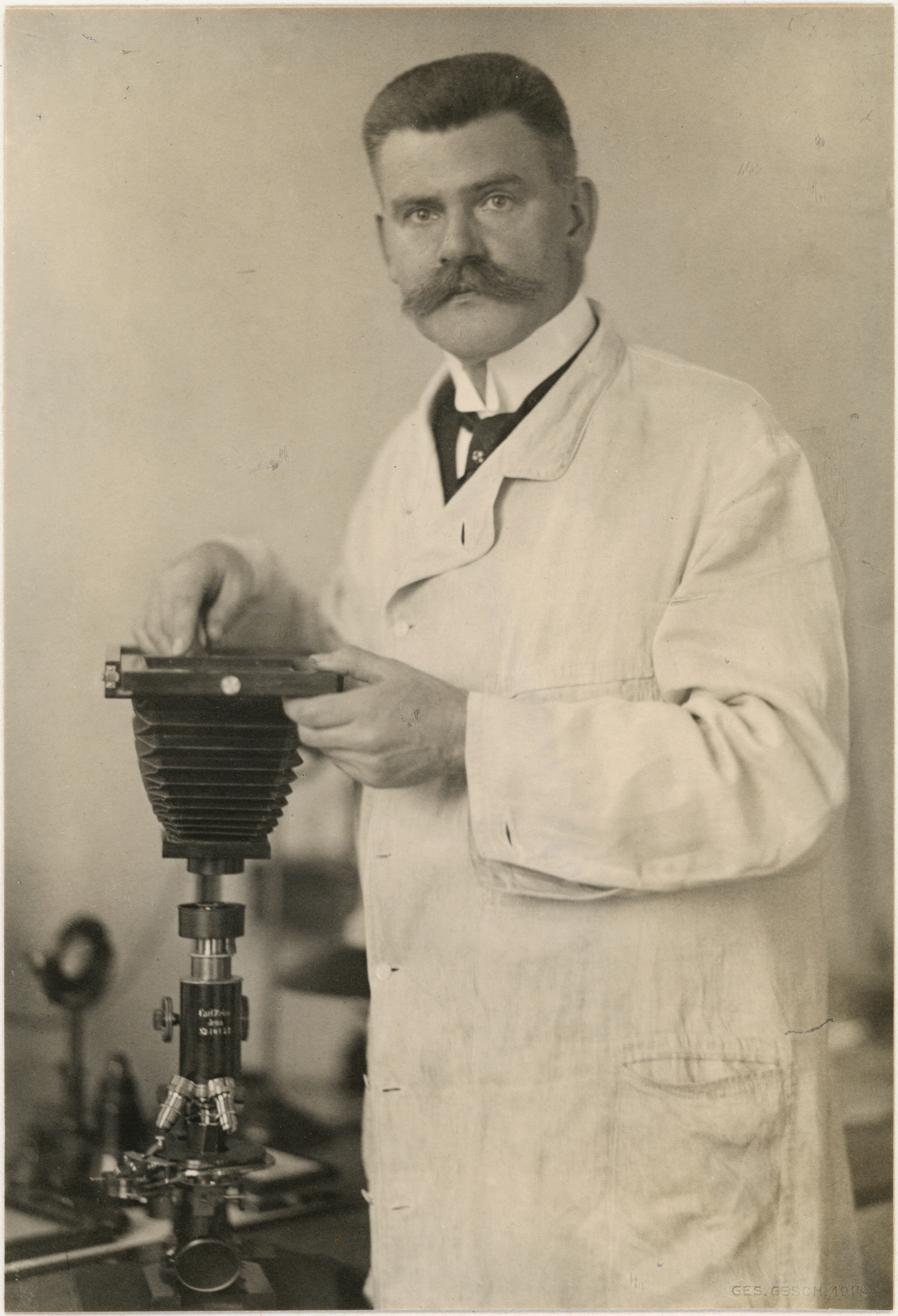
Otto Busse

Otto Emil Franz Ulrich Busse (pronounced [ˈɔtoː ˈbʊsə]; 6 December 1867 – 3 February 1922) was a German pathologist. Busse was born in Gühlitz, Kingdom of Prussia.

He studied medicine at the University of Greifswald, and subsequently became an assistant to Paul Grawitz (1850–1932), (his future father-in-law) at Greifswald. Afterwards he moved to Posen (today Poznań, Poland), where in 1904 he became a professor of pathology. From 1911 until 1922 he was professor of pathological anatomy at the University of Zurich, where he died.

In 1894 Busse was the first to provide a written account of cryptococcosis, caused by a yeast-like fungus now known as Cryptococcus neoformans. This he discovered in a patient with chronic periostitis of the tibia. At the time he called the fungus Saccharomyces hominis. During the same time period, Francesco Sanfelice cultured the yeast-like fungus from peach juice, naming the fungus Saccharomyces neoformans. Infection caused by the fungus has also been referred to as "Busse-Buschke disease", named in conjunction with dermatologist Abraham Buschke (1868–1943).

== See also ==
- Hanns von Meyenburg
