= Secondary sclerosing cholangitis =

- Other names: SSC
- Specialty: Hepatology
- Differential diagnosis: Primary sclerosing cholangitis

Secondary sclerosing cholangitis (SSC) is a chronic cholestatic liver disease. SSC is a sclerosing cholangitis with a known cause. Alternatively, if no cause can be identified, then primary sclerosing cholangitis is diagnosed. SSC is an aggressive and rare disease with complex and multiple causes. It is characterized by inflammation, fibrosis, destruction of the biliary tree and biliary cirrhosis. It can be treated with minor interventions such as continued antibiotic use and monitoring, or in more serious cases, laparoscopic surgery intervention, and possibly a liver transplant.

== Cause ==
SSC is thought to develop as a consequence of known injuries or pathological processes of the biliary tree, such as biliary obstruction, surgical trauma to the bile duct, or ischemic injury to the biliary tree. Secondary causes of SSC include intraductal stone disease, surgical or blunt abdominal trauma, intra-arterial chemotherapy, and recurrent pancreatitis. It has been clearly demonstrated that sclerosing cholangitis can develop after an episode of severe bacterial cholangitis. Also it was suggested that it can result from insult to the biliary tree by obstructive cholangitis secondary to choledocholithiasis, surgical damage, trauma, vascular insults, parasites, or congenital fibrocystic disorders. Additional causes of secondary SC are toxic, due to chemical agents or drugs.

== Diagnosis ==
SSC is clinically related to primary sclerosing cholangitis (PSC), but originates from a known pathological process. Diagnosis of PSC requires the exclusion of all secondary causes of sclerosing cholangitis; else, if a known aetiology can be uncovered, SSC is diagnosed. Its clinical and cholangiographic features may mimic PSC, yet its natural history may be more favorable if recognition is prompt and appropriate therapy is introduced. Sclerosing cholangitis in critically ill patients, however, is associated with rapid disease progression and poor outcome. Serologic testing, radiological imaging and histological analysis can help diagnose SSC.

== Treatment ==
First lines of treatment can include mass spectrum antibiotics or drainage of the bile duct that is infected followed by close monitoring. Endoscopic surgery is favored over open procedures to reduce infection and quicker recovery times. If these fail a liver transplant may be necessary.
