= Choledochal cysts =

- Other names: Bile duct cyst
- Different types of choledochal cysts
- Specialty: Medical genetics

Choledochal cysts (a.k.a. bile duct cyst) are congenital conditions involving cystic dilatation of bile ducts. They are uncommon in western countries but not as rare in East Asian nations like Japan and China.

== Signs and symptoms ==
Most patients have symptoms in the first year of life. It is rare for symptoms to be undetected until adulthood, and usually adults have associated complications. The classic triad of intermittent abdominal pain, jaundice, and a right upper quadrant abdominal mass is found only in minority of patients.

In infants, choledochal cysts usually lead to obstruction of the bile ducts and retention of bile. This leads to jaundice and an enlarged liver. If the obstruction is not relieved, permanent damage may occur to the liver - scarring and cirrhosis - with the signs of portal hypertension (obstruction to the flow of blood through the liver) and ascites (fluid accumulation in the abdomen). There is an increased risk of cancer in the wall of the cyst.

In older individuals, choledochal cysts are more likely to cause abdominal pain and intermittent episodes of jaundice and occasionally cholangitis (inflammation within the bile ducts caused by the spread of bacteria from the intestine into the bile ducts). Inflammation of the pancreas also may occur. The cause of these complications may be related to either abnormal flow of bile within the ducts or the presence of gallstones.

== Diagnosis ==
=== Types ===
They were classified into 5 types by Todani in 1977.

Classification was based on site of the cyst or dilatation. Type I to IV has been subtyped.

- Type I: Most common variety (80-90%) involving saccular or fusiform dilatation of a portion or entire common bile duct (CBD) with normal intrahepatic duct.
- Type II: These cysts are present as an isolated diverticulum protruding from the CBD.
- Type III or Choledochocele: Arise from dilatation of duodenal portion of CBD or where pancreatic duct meets.
- Type IVa: Characterized by multiple dilatations of the intrahepatic and extrahepatic biliary tree.
- Type IVb: Multiple dilatations involving only the extrahepatic bile ducts.
- Type V: Cystic dilatation of intrahepatic biliary ducts without extrahepatic duct disease. The presence of multiple saccular or cystic dilations of the intrahepatic ducts is known as Caroli's disease.
- Type VI: An isolated cyst of the cystic duct is an extremely rare lesion. Only single case reports are documented in the literature. The most accepted classification system of biliary cysts, the Todani classification, does not include this lesion. Cholecystectomy with cystic duct ligation near the common bile duct is curative.

== Treatment ==
Choledochal cysts are treated by surgical excision of the cyst with the formation of a roux-en-Y anastomosis hepaticojejunostomy/ choledochojejunostomy to the biliary duct. Future complications include cholangitis and a 2% risk of malignancy, which may develop in any part of the biliary tree. A recent article published in the Journal of Surgery suggested that choledochal cysts could also be treated with single-incision laparoscopic hepaticojejunostomy with comparable results and less scarring. In cases of saccular type of cyst, excision and placement of T-shaped tube is done. The first peroral endoscopic resection of a choledochal cyst ( typ lll, choledochocele ) was performed by Deyhle in 1973. ( Deutsche medizinische Wochenschrift 99, 71 - 72 especially 83 - 83, Januar 1974

Currently, there is no accepted indication for fetal intervention in the management of prenatally suspected choledochal cysts.
