= Bile duct hamartoma =

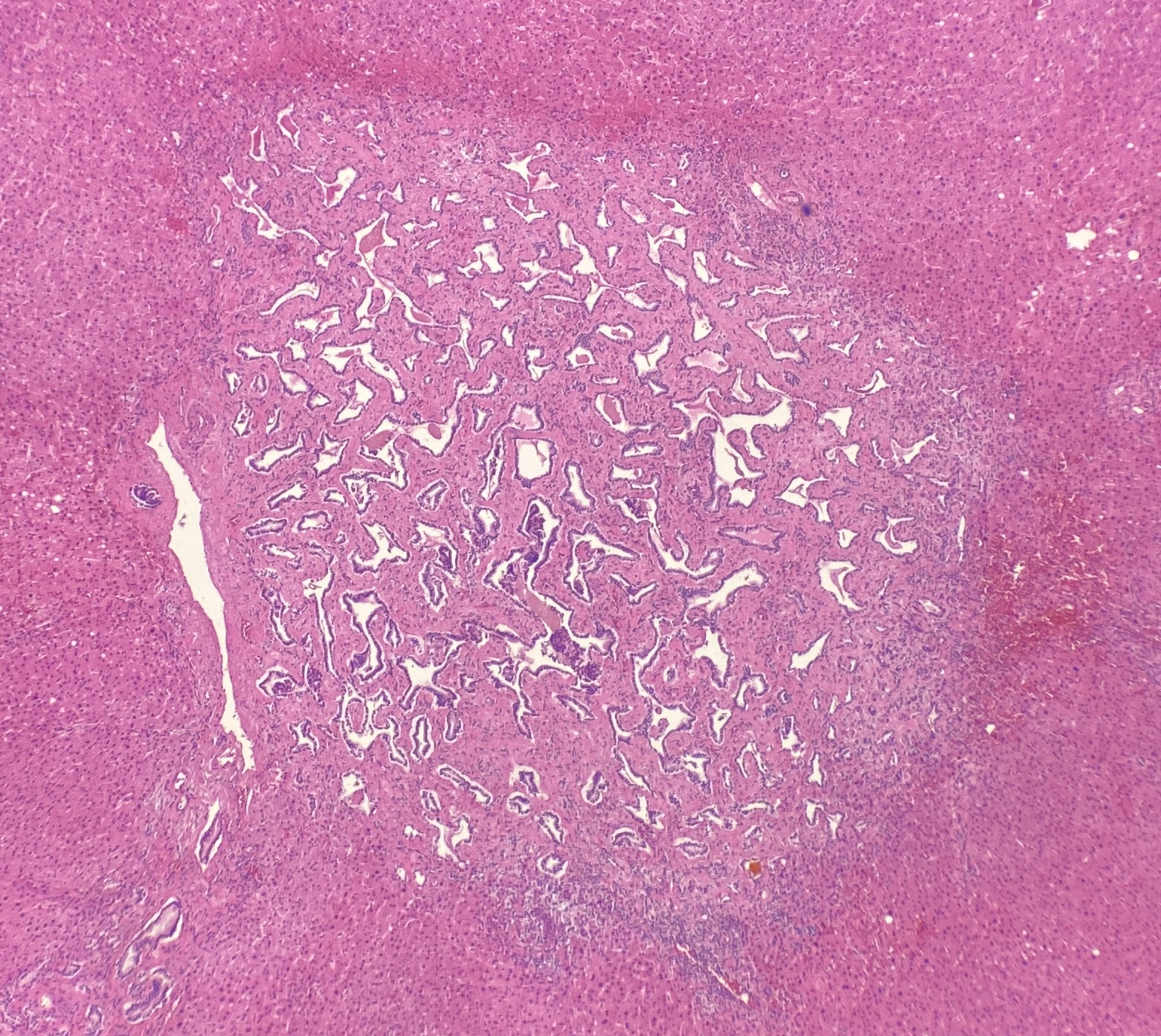
- Histopathology of a bile duct hamartoma, low magnification, H&E stain, showing a well demarcated lesion.

Bile duct hamartoma or biliary hamartoma, are benign lesions of the intrahepatic bile duct. They are classically associated with polycystic liver disease, as may be seen in the context of polycystic kidney disease, and represent a malformation of the liver plate.

== Signs and symptoms ==
Most patients are asymptomatic. When patients do present with symptoms the most common symptom is abdominal pain. Other symptoms include fever, weight loss, and jaundice.

== Causes ==
Biliary duct hamartomas are defects resulting from the failure of embryonic bile duct involution that affect the small interlobular bile ducts. Patients with polycystic kidney disease and polycystic liver are far more likely to have them.

== Diagnosis ==
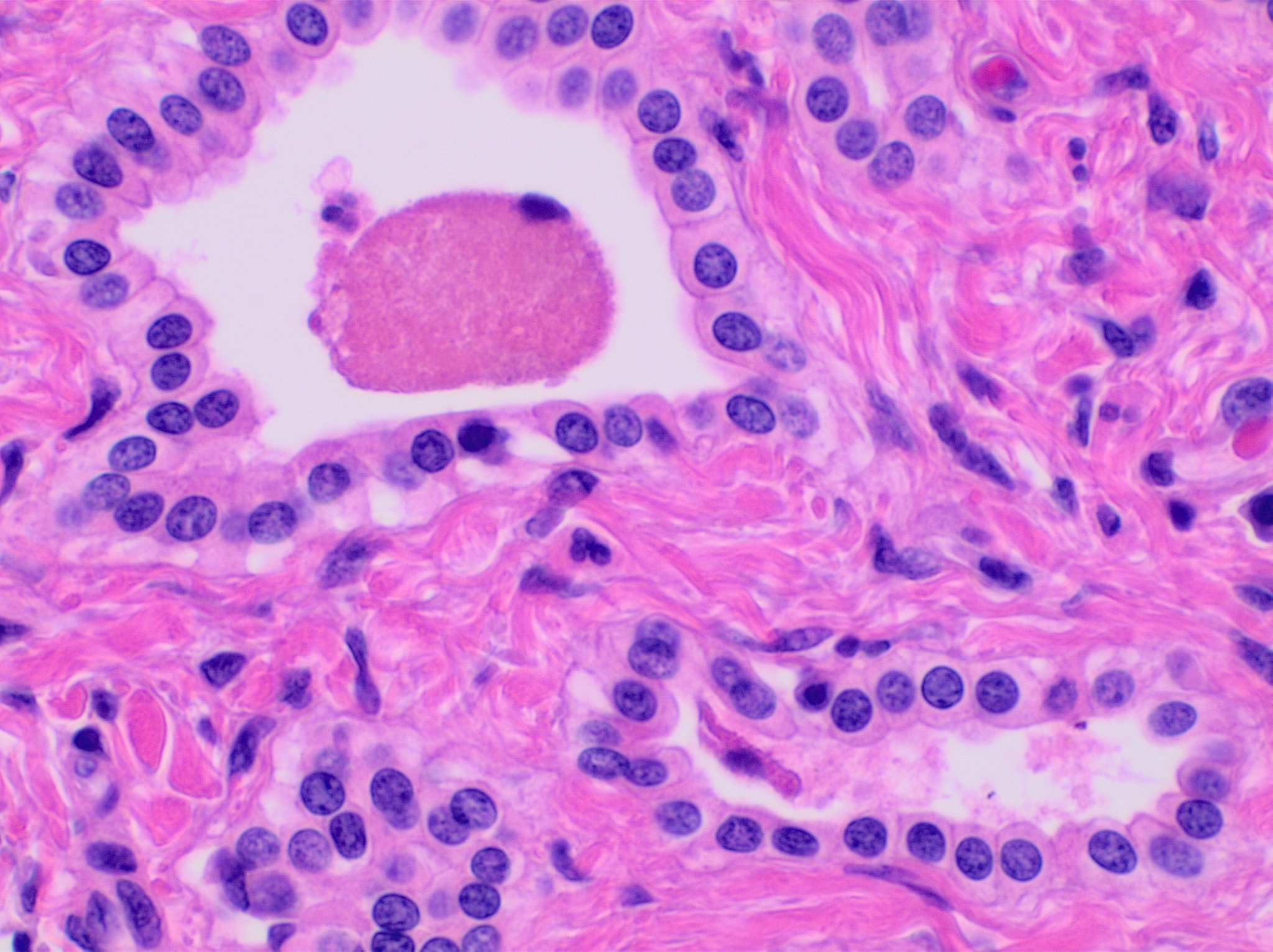
Histopathology of a bile duct hamartoma, high magnification, H&E stain. It shows typical features of bile duct hamartoma: Small to medium-sized, irregularly shaped bile ducts lined by bland cuboidal epithelium (may also be flattened). Prominent intervening collagenous stroma. Bile ducts containing eosinophilic debris (may also contain inspissated bile)

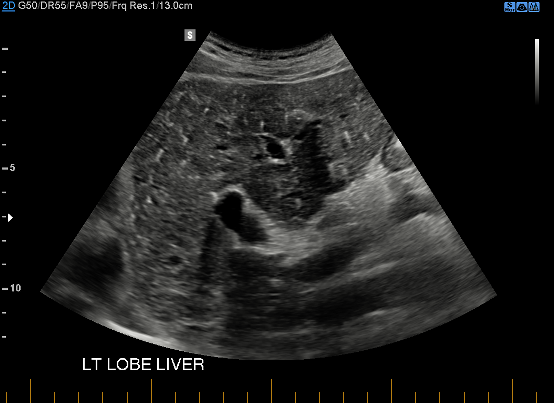
von Meyenburg Complex in ultrasound. Numerous little cysts with ringdown artefacts.

Laboratory findings include high transaminase levels, raised gamma-glutamyl transferase or alkaline phosphatase levels, increased C-reactive protein, hypoalbuminemia, and hematologic abnormalities like thrombocytopenia, leukopenia, leukocytosis, and anemia.

At CT scans, bile duct hamartomas appear as small, well-defined hypo- or isoattenuating masses with little or no enhancement after contrast administration. At MRI, they appear hypointense on T1-weighted images, iso- or slightly hyperintense on T2-weighted images, and hypointense after administration of gadolinium based contrast-agent.

== Eponym ==
The eponymous terms (von Meyenburg complex, Meyenburg complex) are named for Hanns von Meyenburg.

== Additional images ==
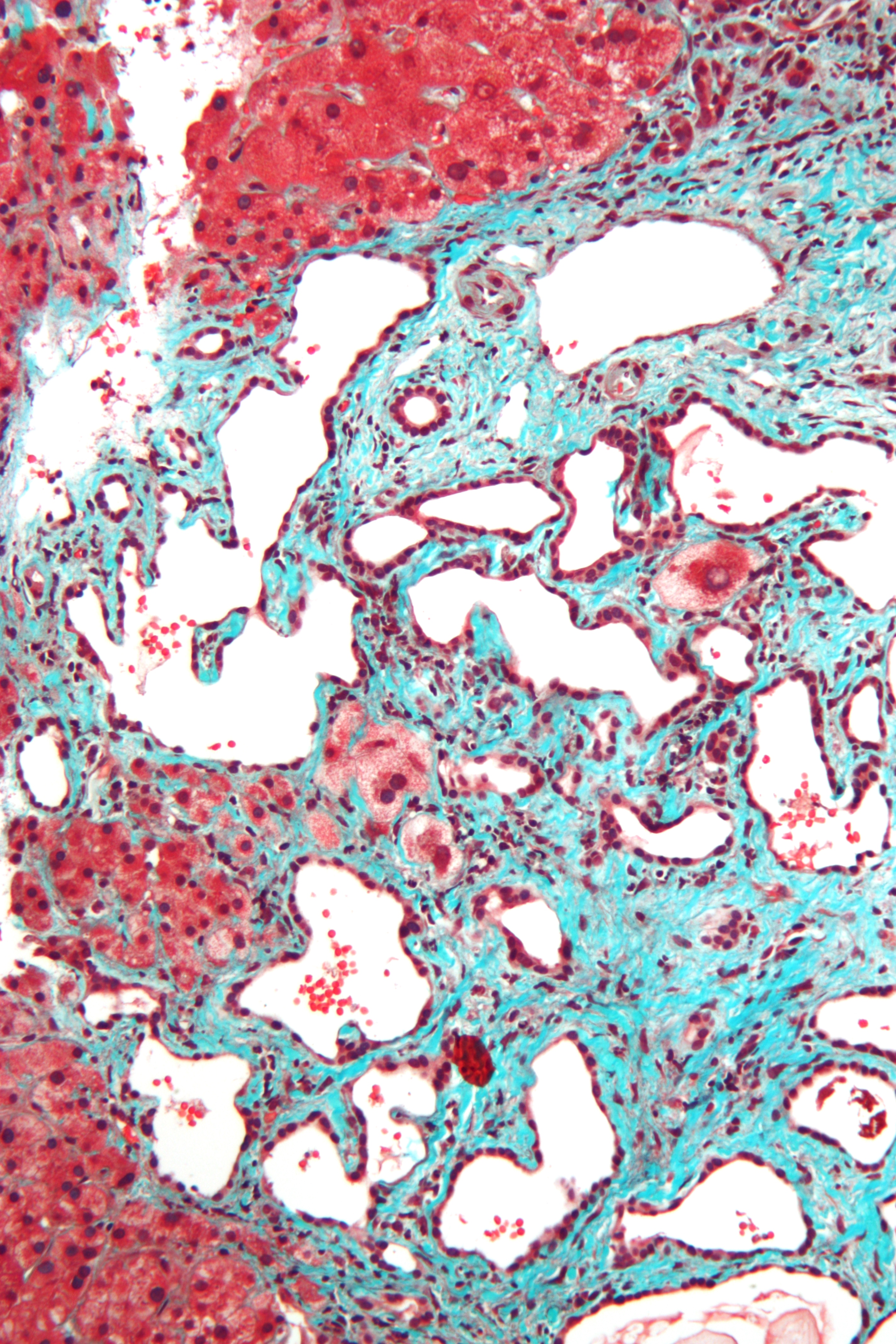
Micrograph of a bile duct hamartoma. Trichrome stain. Intermediate magnification

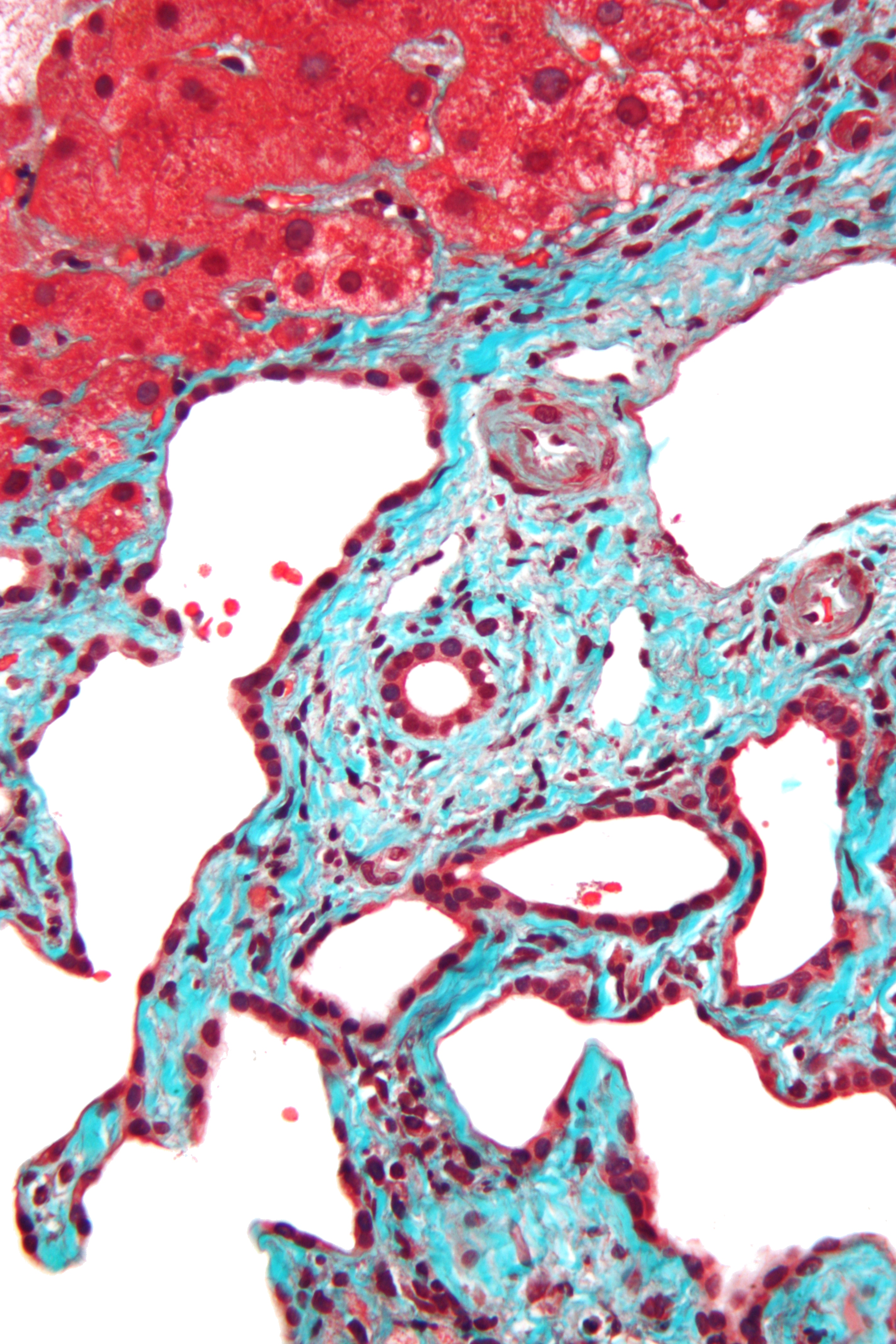
Micrograph of a bile duct hamartoma. Trichrome stain, high magnification

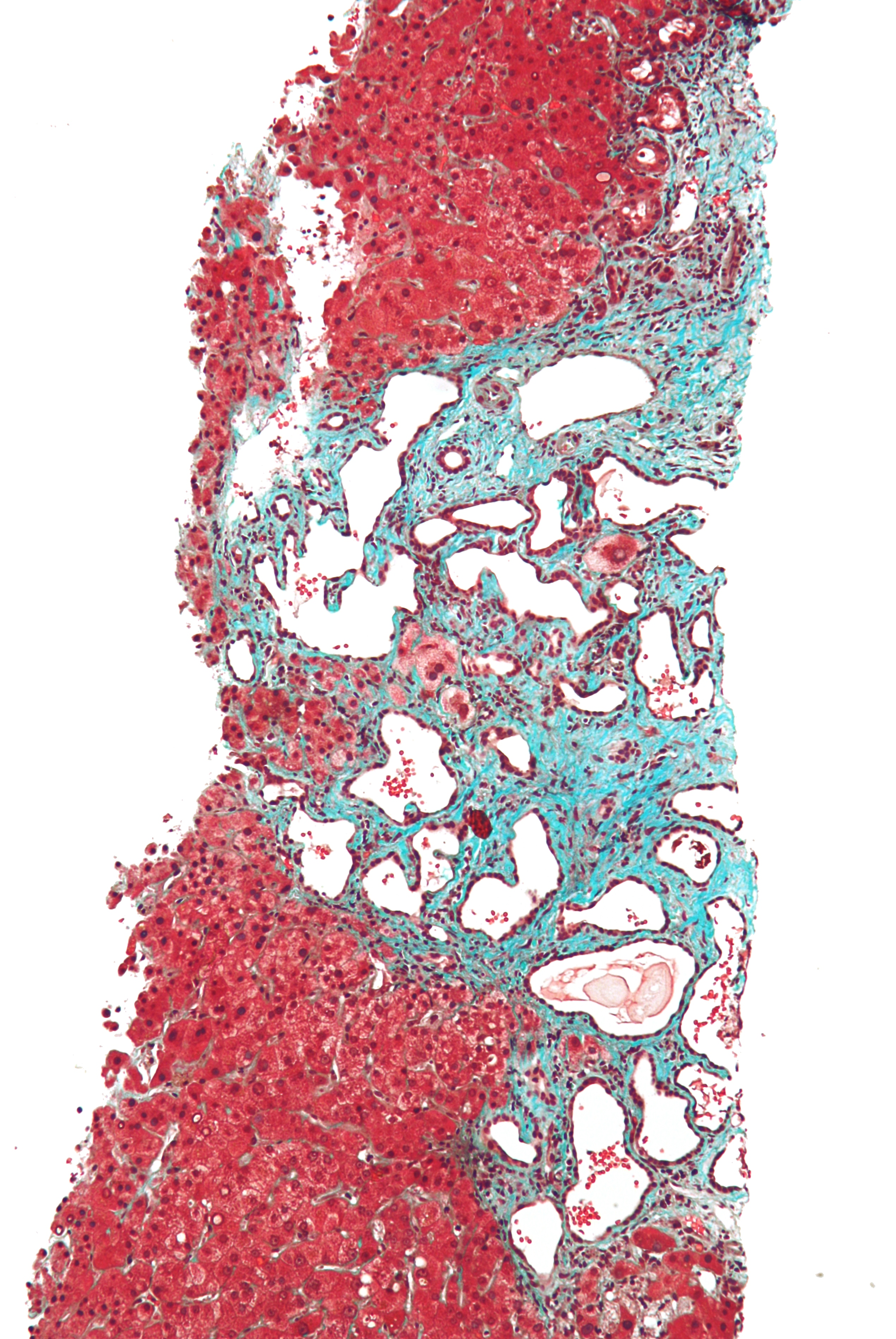
Low magnification micrograph of a bile duct hamartoma. Trichrome stain.

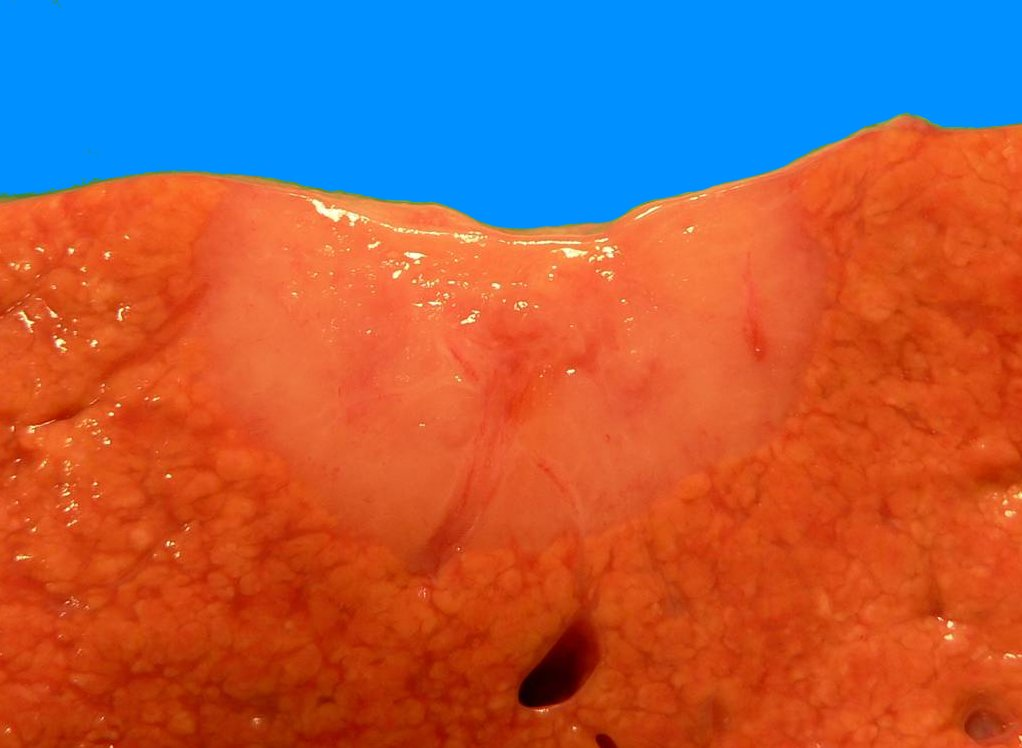
Gross pathologic appearance of a large bile duct hamartoma.

== See also ==
- Cholestasis
- Ground glass hepatocyte
- Mallory body
