= Biliary endoscopic sphincterotomy =

Use of endoscopy and fluoroscopy to treat and diagnose digestive issues

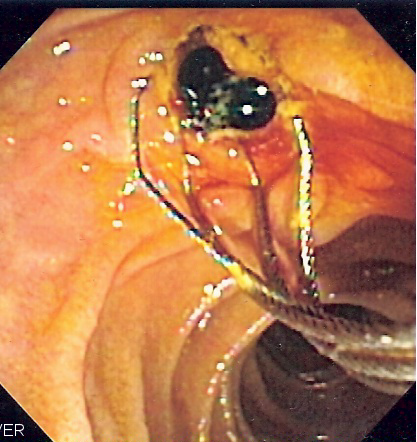
- Duodenoscopic image of two pigment stones extracted from common bile duct after sphincterotomy
- Specialty: Gastroenterology
- ICD-9-CM: 51.85

Biliary endoscopic sphincterotomy is a procedure where the sphincter of Oddi and the segment of the common bile duct where it enters the duodenum are cannulated and then cut with a sphincterotome, a device that includes a wire which cuts with an electric current (electrocautery).

This procedure was developed in both Germany and Japan and was first published in each nation in 1974. It has become a very common technique, useful for treatment of a wide variety of conditions of the biliary system such as the evacuation of gallstones within the bile duct (choledocholithiasis), biliary or papillary strictures, sphincter of Oddi dysfunction, bile leaks, and others. In addition, it is commonly performed during an endoscopic retrograde cholangiopancreatography (ERCP), and it may be used for facilitating diagnostic procedures such as transpapillary bile duct biopsy, papillary tumor biopsy, and insertion of a cholangioscope.

== Medical Uses ==
=== Therapeutic ===
Extraction of choledocholithiasis and/or intrahepatic stones: choledocholithiasis is the presence of gallstones within the common bile duct. They can be either primary (formed within the duct) or secondary (entering the duct from the gallbladder). Biliary endoscopic sphincterotomy allows for opening of the sphincter of Oddi, allowing stones to be removed.

Treatment of benign biliary/papillary strictures: diseases such as primary sclerosing cholangitis can lead to fibrosis and stricture of the ducts of the biliary tree. These strictures can cause cholestasis which can lead to jaundice, pruritus, cholangitis, and gallstone formation. Biliary endoscopic sphincterotomy is sometimes used, with or without stenting, to relieve the obstruction, but systematic reviews have not demonstrated consistent benefits.

Treatment of sphincter of Oddi dysfunction: this is a diagnosis of exclusion which encompasses a broad spectrum of hepatobiliary disorders including spasms, strictures, or inappropriate relaxation. Sphincterotomy appears to be safe and effective for the treatment of sphincter of Oddi dysfunction.

Treatment of bile leaks: leakage of bile into the abdominal cavity is a complication of laparoscopic cholecystectomy. The purpose of biliary endoscopic sphincterotomy in the treatment of a bile leak is to reduce or eliminate the pressure gradient between the bile duct and the duodenum, encouraging transpapillary bile flow and allowing the leak to heal.

Others:

- Palliation of malignant biliary strictures
- Gallbladder drainage
- Biliary parasite removal
- Sump syndrome
- Choledochocele

=== Diagnostic ===
- Biopsy
- Cholangioscope

== Contraindications ==
Bleeding/coagulopathy: platelet count and international normalized ratio (INR) should be checked before the procedure. Discontinuation of antiplatelet therapy or anticoagulation requires consideration of the risks of hemorrhage vs. thrombosis and management should be based on current guidelines.

== Procedure ==
=== Equipment ===
Sphincterotomes: a sphincterotome (also called a papillotome) is a catheter with a cutting wire at its far end. They have various configurations based on cutting wire length, outer diameter, number of lumens, and presence of other features such as the ability to rotate. The sphincterotome is connected to an electrosurgical generator, allowing the cutting wire to function as a knife when an electrical current is applied. Additional lumens allow the addition of a guidewire and injection of radio-opaque contrast. They can be broadly categorized as pull-type, push-type, or needle-knife.

Pull-type: pull-type sphincterotomes consist of a steel cutting wire within a Teflon catheter. The wire exits the catheter approximately 3 cm before its distal end and re-enters the catheter approximately 3 mm from its tip. When tension is applied to the wire, the distal portion of the catheter becomes curved so that the exposed wire is brought upwards into contact with the biliary sphincter and papilla, away from the catheter.

Push-type: push-type sphincterotomes have a similar design to pull-type, but instead tightening the wire pushes it out to form a bow oriented downwards. This is useful for patients with Billroth II anatomy.

Needle-knife: a needle-knife sphincterotome has a retractable cutting wire of 3 to 5 mm with a Teflon sheath. They are most often used for a pre-cut sphincterotomy when standard methods of cannulation fail.

=== Technique ===
Standard sphincterotomy: the sphincterotome is inserted into the bile duct. A cholangiogram is then used to evaluate any biliary abnormalities requiring further intervention. The papilla is then incised with the cutting wire by applying electrocautery.

Pre-cut sphincterotomy: pre-cut biliary endoscopic sphincterotomy refers to the techniques used to cut the papillary mucosa and biliary sphincter in order to expose the underlying bile duct and gain access to it when standard cannulation fails.

Transpancreatic biliary sphincterotomy (septotomy): when the guidewire is unintentionally inserted into the main pancreatic duct the sphincterotome is then placed in the pancreatic duct and used to cut the septum between the pancreatic duct and bile duct. It is then withdrawn and re-directed through the incision site into the bile duct with the guidewire.

Needle knife papillotomy: a needle knife sphincterotome is placed en face to the biliary papilla. An incision is then made stepwise, starting at the upper margin of the papillary orifice and extending towards the biliary sphincter, creating an incision to allow the bile duct to be cannulated.

Needle knife fistulotomy: a needle knife fistulotomy has two different technique which are used. For the first technique an incision is made a few millimeters above the opening to the duct and then extended upwards. The other option is to make an incision in the roof of the papilla and then extend it either up or down without cutting the papillary orifice itself. The rate of pancreatitis after ERCP was significantly lower after fistulotomy, compared to other precut techniques.

=== Modifications for anatomic variations ===
Periampullary diverticulum: periampullary diverticulum makes the procedure more difficult because it becomes harder to assess the incision. Needle-knife fistulotomy or pancreatic stent placement followed by precut sphincterotomy are two of several techniques that have been used to account for the increased difficulty.

Surgically altered anatomy (Billroth II): if a patient has undergone a partial gastrectomy with Billroth II anastomosis, the papilla may appear to be upside down from the perspective of the endoscope compared to normal. Cannulation may need to be performed in a reverse position with the bile duct oriented downwards.

== Risks ==
The reported overall incidence of complications associated with ERCP and biliary endoscopic sphincterotomy has ranged from 3 to 12 percent.

Pancreatitis: biliary endoscopic sphincterotomy is not an independent risk factor for pancreatitis after ERCP.

Bleeding: immediate bleeding occurs during or immediately after biliary endoscopic sphincterotomy. It is seen in up to 30% of patients and self-limiting most of the time. Delayed bleeding occurs from a few hours up to 2 wk after the procedure.

Perforation: the incidence of sphincterotomy related perforation, also named Type 2 duodenal perforation, is between 0% and 1.8%.

Cholangitis/sepsis: the incidence of cholangitis after biliary endoscopic sphincterotomy is between 1% and 3%.

Late complications: long-term complication vs of biliary endoscopic sphincterotomy include recurrent common bile duct stone, cholecystitis, cholangitis, hepatic abscess, papillary stenosis and biliary stricture.

== Alternatives ==
Balloon Dilation: balloon dilation is an alternative often used in patients with a coagulation disorder or if their anatomy makes a traditional sphincterotomy more difficult. Balloon dilation is associated with fewer long term complications owing to preservations of sphincter function.

== See also ==
- ERCP
