= Intravenous cholangiography =

Medical imaging procedure

- ICD-9-CM: 87.52
- OPS-301 code: 3-13c.0

Intravenous cholangiography is a form of cholangiography that was introduced in 1954.

== Overview ==
The intravenous cholangiogram or IVC is a radiologic (x-ray) procedure that is used primarily to look at the larger bile ducts within the liver and the bile ducts outside the liver. The procedure can be used to locate gallstones within these bile ducts. IVC also can be used to identify other causes of obstruction to the flow of bile, for example, narrowings (strictures) of the bile ducts and cancers that may impair the normal flow of bile.

== Procedure ==
To do an IVC, an iodine-containing dye (meglumine ioglycamate) is injected intravenously into the blood. The liver then removes the dye from the blood and excretes it into the bile. The iodine is sufficiently concentrated as it is secreted into the bile that it does not need to be further concentrated by the gallbladder to outline the bile ducts and any gallstones that may be there. The gallbladder is not always seen on an IVC, as the iodine-containing bile may bypass the gallbladder entirely and empty directly into the small intestine.

== Risks ==
Occasional serious allergic reactions can occur to any iodine-containing dye. These reactions can usually be treated and rarely result in death.

== Indications ==
Currently, IVC is not as commonly performed. Its use was always limited, because it did not work when there was more than a minimal amount of jaundice, and many of the conditions it was used to detect also caused substantial jaundice. IVC has been largely replaced by other diagnostic procedures including endoscopic retrograde cholangiopancreatography (ERCP), endoscopic ultrasound and, increasingly, by magnetic resonance cholangiopancreatography (MRCP), none of which are affected by jaundice. It is sometimes used when ERCP is unsuccessful.
