= Sphincter of Oddi dysfunction =

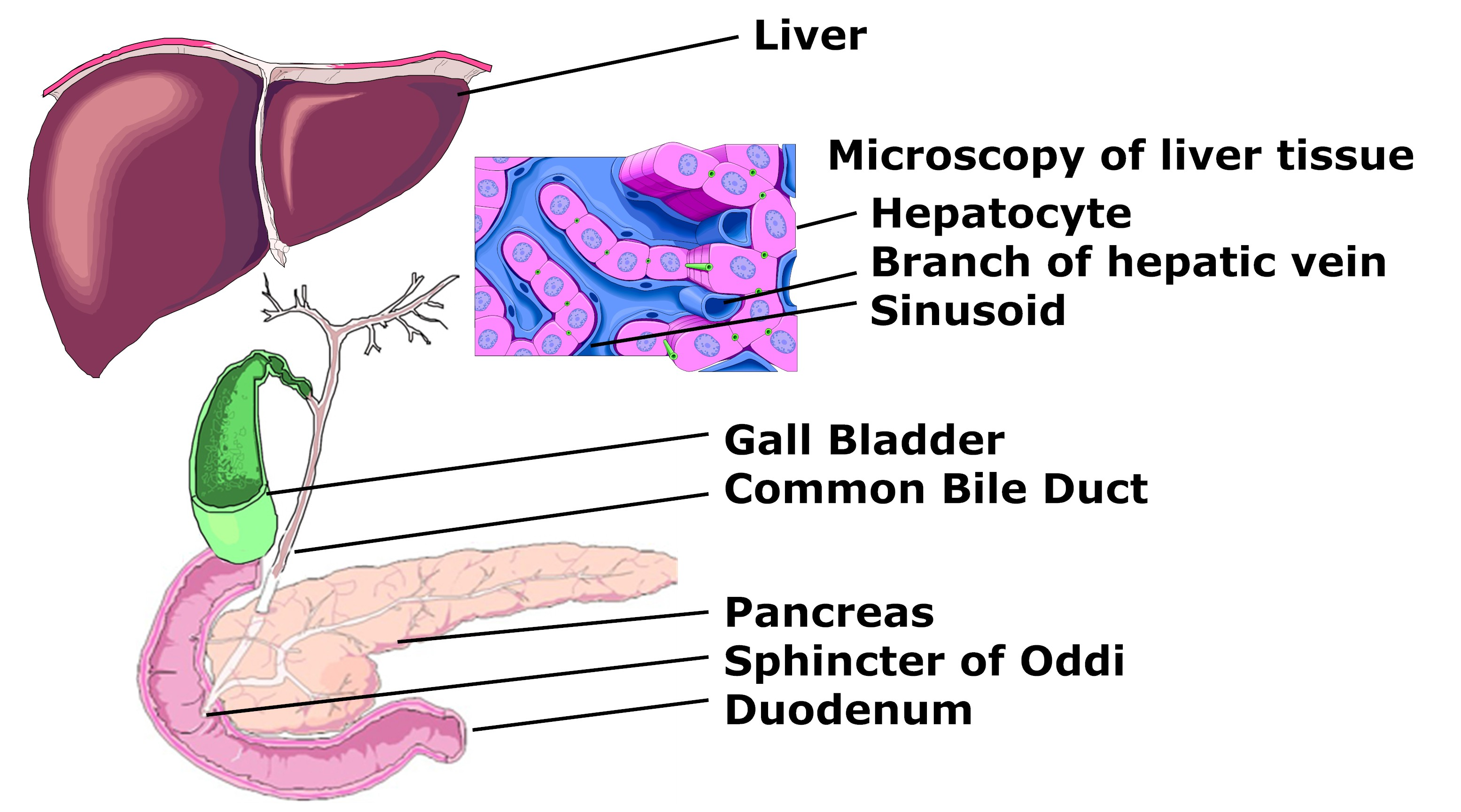
- A diagram of the biliary tree showing the sphincter of Oddi. Note that part of the gall bladder has been removed, and the liver has been lifted off the tree.
- Specialty: Gastroenterology, general surgery

Sphincter of Oddi dysfunction refers to a group of functional disorders leading to abdominal pain due to dysfunction of the Sphincter of Oddi: functional biliary sphincter of Oddi and functional pancreatic sphincter of Oddi disorder. The sphincter of Oddi is a sphincter muscle, a circular band of muscle at the bottom of the biliary tree which controls the flow of pancreatic juices and bile into the second part of the duodenum. The pathogenesis of this condition is recognized to encompass stenosis or dyskinesia of the sphincter of Oddi (especially after cholecystectomy); consequently the terms biliary dyskinesia, papillary stenosis, and postcholecystectomy syndrome have all been used to describe this condition. Both stenosis and dyskinesia can obstruct flow through the sphincter of Oddi and can therefore cause retention of bile in the biliary tree and pancreatic juice in the pancreatic duct.

Individuals with sphincter of Oddi dysfunction present with abdominal pain resembling that of structural or inflammatory disorders of the gallbladder, biliary tree or pancreas. Among other characteristics, the pain is typically in the upper part of the abdomen or in the right upper quadrant of the abdomen, lasts 30 minutes or longer, and is not associated with a structural abnormality that could lead to these symptoms. The disorder is classified into two subtypes: functional biliary sphincter of Oddi disorder, where there is no disturbance in pancreatic enzyme measurements, such as amylase and lipase; and, functional pancreatic sphincter of Oddi disorder, where pancreatic enzyme measurements are elevated.

Attacks can be precipitated by opioid analgesics, particularly in patients having undergone a cholecystectomy or bariatric surgery.

== Classification ==
Functional disorders of the gallbladder, bile duct and pancreas have been defined and classified by the Rome criteria for functional gastrointestinal disorders. The criteria outline three variants of functional disorders of the gallbladder, bile duct and pancreas, termed functional gallbladder disorder, functional biliary sphincter of Oddi disorder and functional pancreatic sphincter of Oddi disorder. All of the following criteria need to be met for as part of the definition of a functional disorder of the gallbladder:

- the pain must be located in the upper part of the abdomen and/or the right upper quadrant of the abdomen
- episodes of pain must last at least 30 minutes
- the symptoms must be recurrent, and occur at differing intervals
- the pain must incrementally increase to a "steady level"
- the pain must be severe enough the patient's daily activities are affected, or that the patient must attend the emergency department
- the pain must not be relieved by any of bowel movements, change in posture, or antacids; and,
- other structural disorders that could explain the symptoms must be excluded.

=== Functional gallbladder disorder ===
Individuals are classified as having a functional gallbladder disorder if the above criteria are met, if the gallbladder is present, and if the testing of liver enzymes, conjugated bilirubin, and pancreatic enzymes (amylase and lipase) are normal.

=== Functional biliary sphincter of Oddi disorder ===
If all of the above criteria are met, individuals are classified as having a functional biliary sphincter of Oddi disorder, if the testing of pancreatic enzymes (amylase and lipase) is normal.

The old Milwaukee classification of biliary sphincter of Oddi dysfunction (SOD) used to divide the condition into three subtypes: but it is no longer in use. Type I included patients with biliary-type abdominal pain, with all of altered liver enzymes on blood testing, dilated biliary ducts on ultrasound or ERCP, and delayed bile clearance on HIDA scan. Type II included patients with biliary-type abdominal pain associated with at least one of the following: altered liver enzymes on blood testing, dilated biliary ducts on imaging tests, and delayed bile clearance on HIDA scan. Biliary-type pain in the absence of any sign of biliary or pancreatic alteration was the so-called Type III biliary SOD. The hypothesis that this pain could be linked to SOD has been studied in a large trial published in JAMA (2014) where patients were randomized to sphincterotomy or sham surgery. Contrary to expectations, patients who were not subjected to sphincterotomy fared better. Overall, the investigators found that only 23% of the patients who underwent sphincterotomy improved versus 37% of the control group. The EPISOD trial has substantiated the ineffectiveness of endoscopic sphincterotomy in patients with these symptoms and SOD Type III is no longer considered to be a clinical entity.

== Characteristics ==
Sphincter of Oddi dysfunction may be suggested by pain which seems to come from a biliary origin, which may or may not be associated with transient increases of liver or pancreatic enzymes. Common bile duct dilation and episodes of pancreatitis are also signs.

== Pathophysiology ==
Two mechanisms are involved in the development of sphincter of Oddi dysfunction, either or both of which may be contributory to the condition: stenosis, or narrowing of the sphincter of Oddi (also termed papillary stenosis), and dyskinesia, or alteration in the function of the sphincter of Oddi (also termed biliary dyskinesia). Individuals with stenosis of the sphincter of Oddi typically have an elevated baseline pressure of the sphincter of Oddi, due to an anatomical problem that leads to narrowing of the sphincter, such as recurrent passage of gallstones through the ampulla of Vater, trauma to the sphincter from procedures such as endoscopic retrograde cholangiopancreatography or biliary surgery, or infections of the common bile duct. In contrast, dyskinesia of the sphincter of Oddi is a purely functional disorder, wherein there is intermittent obstruction of the bile duct due to inappropriate spasms. The reasons for dyskinesia of the sphincter of Oddi are not completely understood, but believed to be due to alteration in local gut hormones and peptides, such as cholecystokinin, which act on the sphincter or to altered neuronal control of the sphincter.

== Diagnosis ==
For diagnosis, measures of liver biochemistry and pancreatic enzymes are performed. Along with ruling out structural abnormalities, normally by performing an abdominal ultrasound and endoscopic retrograde cholangiopancreatography (ERCP). Measurements of bile transit when performing ERCP are taken to help evaluate different treatment options. Sphincter of Oddi dysfunction is best diagnosed using manometry-an internal test done to measure the pressures within surrounding ducts to determine whether or not the muscle is functioning normally.

== Treatment ==
Medication (to prevent spasms) or sphincterotomy (surgical procedure to cut the muscle) are the standard treatments for sphincter of Oddi dysfunction. One or the other may be better based on the classification of the condition.

== See also ==
- Stenosis
- Dyskinesia
- Bile
