= Murphy's sign =

Maneuver during abdominal examination

- Purpose: Differentiating upper right quadrant pain

In medicine, Murphy's sign (also known as Sweeney’s sign) is a maneuver during a physical examination as part of the abdominal examination. It is useful for differentiating pain in the right upper quadrant. Typically, it is positive in cholecystitis, but negative in choledocholithiasis, pyelonephritis, and ascending cholangitis.

== During physical examination ==
Classically, Murphy's sign is tested for during an abdominal examination in supine position; it is performed by asking the patient to breathe out and then gently placing the hand below the costal margin on the right side at the mid-clavicular line (the approximate location of the gallbladder). The patient is then instructed to breathe in. Normally, during inspiration, the abdominal contents are pushed downward as the diaphragm moves down (and lungs expand). If the patient stops breathing in (as the gallbladder is tender and, in moving downward, comes in contact with the examiner's fingers) and winces with a "catch" in breath, the test is considered positive. In order for the test to be considered negative, the same maneuver must not elicit pain when performed on the left side.

== Predictive value ==
Murphy's sign has a high sensitivity and negative predictive value, although the specificity is not high. However, in the elderly the sensitivity is markedly lower; a negative Murphy's sign in an elderly person is not useful for ruling out cholecystitis if other tests and the clinical history suggest the diagnosis.

== History ==
The sign is named after American physician John Benjamin Murphy (1857–1916), a Chicago surgeon from the 1880s to the early 1900s, who first described the hypersensitivity to deep palpation in the subcostal area when a patient with gallbladder disease takes a deep breath.

== See also ==
- Courvoisier's law – when the gallbladder is palpable, painless jaundice is unlikely to be related to gallstones.
- Murphy's triad
