= Primary sclerosing cholangitis =

Inflammatory disease of the bile ducts

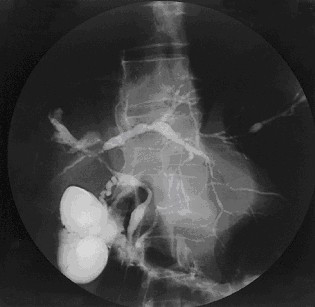
- Cholangiogram of primary sclerosing cholangitis
- Specialty: Gastroenterology
- Symptoms: Typically no symptoms; abdominal pain, fatigue, fever, jaundice
- Complications: Cholangiocarcinoma
- Duration: Long term and progressive
- Causes: Unknown; most likely autoimmune
- Risk factors: Inflammatory bowel disease, pre-existing liver disease
- Diagnostic method: Radiological imaging
- Differential diagnosis: Secondary causes of sclerosing cholangitis
- Treatment: Symptomatic

Primary sclerosing cholangitis (PSC) is a long-term progressive disease of the liver and gallbladder characterized by inflammation and scarring of the bile ducts, which normally allow bile to drain from the gallbladder. Affected individuals may have no symptoms or may experience signs and symptoms of liver disease, such as jaundice, itching, and abdominal pain.

The bile duct scarring that occurs in PSC narrows the ducts of the biliary tree and impedes the flow of bile to the duodenum. Eventually, it can lead to cirrhosis of the liver and liver failure. PSC increases the risk of various cancers, including liver cancer, gallbladder carcinoma, colorectal cancer, and cholangiocarcinoma. The underlying cause of PSC is unknown. Genetic susceptibility, immune system dysfunction, and abnormal composition of the gut flora may play a role. This is further suggested by the observation that around 75% of individuals with PSC also have inflammatory bowel disease (IBD), most often ulcerative colitis.

No effective medical treatment for primary sclerosing cholangitis is known. Its most definitive treatment is a liver transplant, but disease recurrence can occur in 25–30% of cases. For patients unable or unwilling to receive a transplant, therapy primarily focuses on relieving symptoms, rather than stopping disease progression. If the sclerosing cholangitis is a secondary effect of a different disease, treatment is directed towards the underlying cause.

PSC is a rare disease and most commonly affects people with IBD. About 3.0 to 7.5% of people with ulcerative colitis have PSC, and 80% of people with PSC have some form of IBD. Diagnosis usually occurs in people in their 30s or 40s. Individuals of Northern European ancestry are affected more often than people of Southern European or Asian descent. Men are affected more often than women. The disease was initially described in the mid-1800s, but was not fully characterized until the 1970s. The advent of improved medical-imaging techniques, such as endoscopic retrograde cholangiopancreatography, enabled more complete description and understanding.

== Signs and symptoms ==
Nearly half of people with PSC do not have symptoms, and are often incidentally discovered to have PSC due to abnormal liver function tests; however, a substantial proportion have debilitating signs and symptoms of the disease. Signs and symptoms of PSC may include severe itching and nonspecific fatigue. Jaundice may also be seen. Enlargement of the liver and spleen are seen in roughly 40% of affected individuals. Abdominal pain affects about 20% of people with PSC.

Multiple episodes of life-threatening acute cholangitis (infection within the bile ducts) can be seen due to impaired drainage of the bile ducts, which increases the risk of infection.

- Dark urine due to excess conjugated bilirubin, which is water-soluble and excreted by the kidneys (i.e. choluria)
- Malabsorption, especially of fat, and steatorrhea (fatty stool), due to an inadequate amount of bile reaching the small intestine, leading to decreased levels of the fat-soluble vitamins, A, D, E, and K.
- Portal hypertension, a complication of cirrhosis, which can manifest with esophageal and parastomal varices as well as hepatic encephalopathy (mental status alteration/disturbance caused by liver dysfunction and shunting of blood away from the scarred liver; such that ammonia detoxification is reduced with concomitant encephalopathy) or ascites.

== Cause ==
The exact cause of primary sclerosing cholangitis is unknown, and its pathogenesis is improperly understood. Although PSC is thought to be caused by autoimmune disease, it does not demonstrate a clear response to immunosuppressants. Thus, many experts believe it to be a complex, multifactorial (including immune-mediated) disorder and perhaps one that encompasses several different hepatobiliary diseases. Alternatively, some experts have suggested that the reason immunosuppressant medications are ineffective is because PSC almost always remains undiagnosed until a very advanced stage, at which point damage may be irreversible or require more aggressive treatment than other autoimmune diseases.

Data have provided novel insights suggesting:

1. an important association between the intestinal microbiota and PSC (reduced diversity of gut bacteria, an increased abundance of pathobionts and altered microbial metabolism, i.e. reduced production of short-chain fatty acids and B-Vitamins) and
2. a process referred to as cellular senescence and the senescence-associated secretory phenotype in the pathogenesis of PSC.

In addition, longstanding, well-recognized associations are seen between PSC and human leukocyte antigen alleles (A1, B8, and DR3).

== Pathophysiology ==
PSC is characterized by inflammation of the bile ducts (cholangitis) with consequent stricturing (i.e., narrowing) and hardening (sclerosis) of these ducts due to scar formation, be it inside and/or outside the liver. The resulting scarring of the bile ducts obstructs the flow of bile, which further perpetuates bile duct and liver injury. Chronic impairment of bile flow due to blockage and dysfunctional bile transport (cholestasis) causes progressive biliary fibrosis and ultimately biliary cirrhosis and liver failure.

The primary physiological function of bile is to assist in the breakdown and absorption of fat in the intestinal tract; a relative deficiency of bile can lead to fat malabsorption and deficiencies of fat-soluble vitamins (A, D, E, K).

Liver enlargement is seen due to portal hypertension caused by compression of portal veins by the proximate sclerosed intrahepatic bile ducts, and leads to right upper quadrant abdominal pain.

== Diagnosis ==
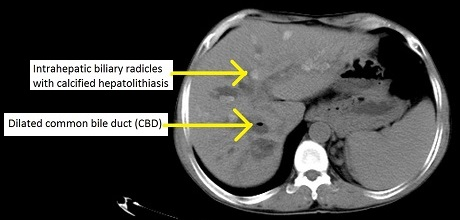
CT scan findings in a case of primary sclerosing cholangitis

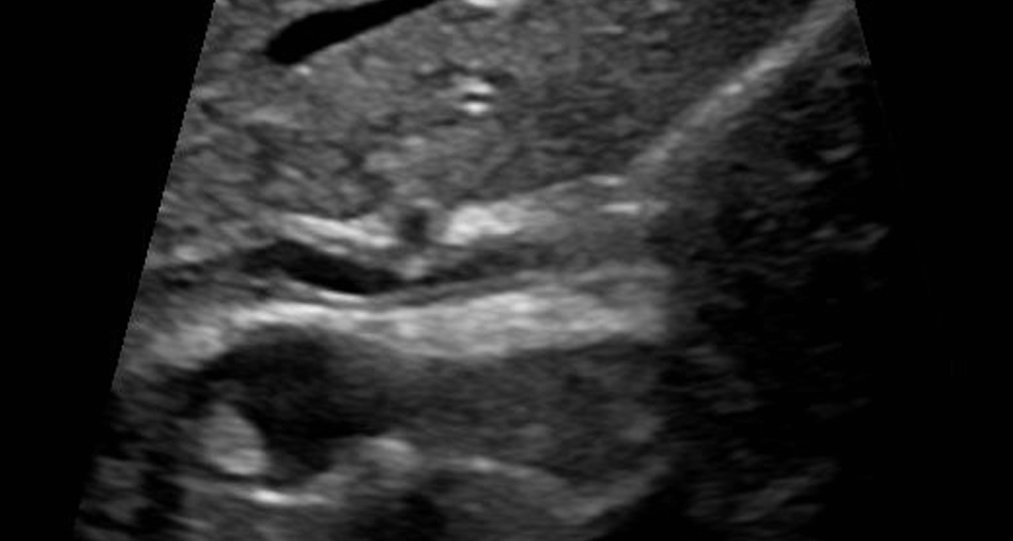
Ultrasound of sclerosing cholangitis in the common bile duct

PSC is generally diagnosed on the basis of having at least two of three clinical criteria after secondary causes of sclerosing cholangitis have been ruled out:

- serum alkaline phosphatase (ALP) > 1.5x the upper limit of normal for longer than 6 months
- cholangiography demonstrating biliary strictures or irregularity consistent with PSC
- liver biopsy consistent with PSC (if available)

Historically, a cholangiogram would be obtained via endoscopic retrograde cholangiopancreatography (ERCP), which typically reveals "beading" (alternating strictures and dilation) of the bile ducts inside and/or outside the liver. Currently, the preferred option for diagnostic cholangiography, given its noninvasive yet highly accurate nature, is magnetic resonance cholangiopancreatography (MRCP), a magnetic resonance imaging technique. MRCP has unique strengths, including high spatial resolution, and can even be used to visualize the biliary tract of small animal models of PSC.

Most people with PSC have evidence of autoantibodies and abnormal immunoglobulin levels. For example, approximately 80% of people with PSC have perinuclear antineutrophil cytoplasmic antibodies (P-ANCA); however, this and other immunoglobulin findings are not specific to those with PSC and are of unclear clinical significance/consequence. Antinuclear antibodies and anti-smooth muscle antibody are found in 20–50% of PSC patients, and likewise are not specific for the disease, but may identify a subgroup of PSC patients who also have autoimmune hepatitis (i.e. PSC-AIH overlap syndrome).

The differential diagnosis can include primary biliary cholangitis (formerly referred to as primary biliary cirrhosis), drug-induced cholestasis, cholangiocarcinoma, IgG4-related disease, post-liver transplantation nonanastomotic biliary strictures, and HIV-associated cholangiopathy. Primary sclerosing cholangitis and primary biliary cholangitis are distinct entities and exhibit important differences, including the site of tissue damage within the liver, associations with IBD, which includes ulcerative colitis and Crohn's disease, response to treatment, and risks of disease progression.

=== Classification ===
Primary sclerosing cholangitis is typically classified into three subgroups based on whether the small and/or large bile ducts are affected. The subgroups of PSC include:

- Classic PSC
- Small-duct PSC
- PSC associated with autoimmune hepatitis

== Management ==
No pharmacologic treatment has been approved by the U.S. Food and Drug Administration for PSC. Some experts recommend a trial of ursodeoxycholic acid (UDCA), a bile acid occurring naturally in small quantities in humans, as it has been shown to lower elevated liver enzyme numbers in patients with PSC and has proven effective in other cholestatic liver diseases. However, UDCA has yet to be shown to clearly lead to improved liver histology and survival. Guidelines from the American Association for the Study of Liver Diseases and the American College of Gastroenterology do not support the use of UDCA but guidelines from the European Association for the Study of the Liver do endorse the use of moderate doses (13–15 milligrams per kilogram) of UDCA for PSC.

Supportive treatment for PSC symptoms is the cornerstone of management. These therapies are aimed at relieving symptoms such as itching with antipruritics (e.g. bile acid sequestrants such as cholestyramine); antibiotics to treat episodes of ascending cholangitis; and vitamin supplements, as people with PSC are often deficient in fat-soluble vitamins (A, D, E, and K).

ERCP and specialized techniques may also be needed to help distinguish between a benign PSC stricture and a bile-duct cancer (cholangiocarcinoma).

Liver transplantation is the only proven long-term treatment of PSC. Indications for transplantation include recurrent bacterial ascending cholangitis, decompensated cirrhosis, hepatocellular carcinoma, hilar cholangiocarcinoma, and complications of portal hypertension. Not all patients are candidates for liver transplantation, and some experience disease recurrence afterward. The reasons why some patients develop recurrent PSC remains largely obscure, but surprisingly, those without recurrence of disease (hence protected from recurrence) are characterized by an increased presence of the potentially pathogenic Shigella species.

== Complications ==
Cholangiocarcinoma (CCA) represents a major complication and the leading cause of death in patients with primary sclerosing cholangitis (PSC), with a lifetime prevalence ranging from 6-13%. Patients with PSC have a 400-600 fold higher risk of developing CCA compared to the general population, with an annual risk between 0.5 and 1.5%. Notably, 30-50% of PSC-associated CCAs are diagnosed within the first year after PSC diagnosis, and up to 80% of patients die within one year of CCA detection. Risk factors include advanced age, male sex, concomitant inflammatory bowel disease, and high-grade biliary strictures. The development of CCA follows a multistep carcinogenesis model involving chronic inflammation, which progresses from damaged biliary epithelium to dysplasia and eventually invasive cancer, with molecular mechanisms including inflammatory pathways, oxidative stress, genetic alterations (commonly affecting p53), and epigenetic changes that create an aberrant phenotype in cholangiocytes.

== Prognosis ==
There are no reliable prognostic models for PSC, owing to the highly variable disease course. Patients who are asymptomatic at the time of diagnosis are known to have better outcomes than those who have symptoms. However, many asymptomatic patients will develop symptoms later in time. Laboratory tests such as liver function tests are surprisingly unreliable when used as prognostic indicators for PSC.

Estimated median survival from diagnosis until liver transplant or PSC-related death is 21.3 years. Various models have been developed to help predict survival, but their use is generally best suited for research and not clinical purposes. A serum alkaline phosphatase less than 1.5 times the upper limit of normal has been associated with better outcomes, but its use in predicting long-term outcomes is unclear. An IgA isotype autoantibody to the pancreatic GP2 protein (anti-GP2 IgA antibody) is the first verified prognostic biomarker in PSC. The role of anti-GP2 IgA in PSC was simultaneously investigated and reported by two research groups, and later confirmed by others. Association was demonstrated between anti-GP2 IgA and progressive liver fibrosis, cholangiocarcinoma development and shorter transplantation free survival in PSC patients.

Other markers which may be measured and monitored are a complete blood count, serum liver enzymes, bilirubin levels (usually grossly elevated), kidney function, and electrolytes. However, none of these tests are reliable indicators of prognosis, as they are either specific to certain disease complications or have a tendency to fluctuate over time, irrespective of the actual disease progression. Fecal fat measurement is occasionally ordered when symptoms of malabsorption (e.g., gross steatorrhea) are prominent.

=== Cancer ===
Cholangiocarcinoma, a major complication of PSC, is associated with a very poor prognosis. Approximately 80% of patients diagnosed with PSC-associated cholangiocarcinoma die within 1 year.

The development of any of the cancers associated with PSC predicts a poor prognosis. Complications from PSC-associated cancers account for 40% of deaths from PSC. Primary sclerosing cholangitis is one of the major known risk factors for cholangiocarcinoma, a cancer of the biliary tree, for which the lifetime risk among patients with PSC is 10-15%. This represents a 400-fold greater risk of developing cholangiocarcinoma compared to the general population. Surveillance for cholangiocarcinoma in patients with PSC is encouraged, with some experts recommending annual surveillance with a specialized imaging study and serum markers, although consensus regarding the modality and interval has yet to be established. Similarly, a screening colonoscopy is recommended in people who receive a new diagnosis of primary sclerosing cholangitis since their risk of colorectal cancer is 10 times higher than that of the general population.

=== Related diseases ===
PSC is strongly associated with IBD, in particular ulcerative colitis (UC) and to a lesser extent Crohn's disease. As many as 5% of patients with IBD are co-diagnosed with PSC, and approximately 70% of people with PSC have IBD. Of note, the presence of colitis appears to be associated with a greater risk of liver disease progression and bile duct cancer (cholangiocarcinoma) development, although this relationship remains poorly understood. Close monitoring of PSC patients is vital.

Various forms of gallbladder disease such as gallstones and gallbladder polyps are also common in those with PSC. Approximately 25% of people with PSC have gallstones. Ultrasound surveillance of the gallbladder every year is recommended for people with PSC. Any person with PSC who is found to have a mass in the gallbladder should undergo surgical removal of the gallbladder due to the high risk of cholangiocarcinoma. Osteoporosis (hepatic osteodystrophy) and hypothyroidism are also associated with PSC.

A 2–3:1 male-to-female predilection occurs in primary sclerosing cholangitis. PSC can affect men and women at any age, although it is commonly diagnosed in the fourth decade of life, most often in the presence of IBD. PSC progresses slowly and is often asymptomatic, so it can be present for years before it is diagnosed and before it causes clinically significant consequences. Relatively few data are available on the prevalence and incidence of PSC, with studies in different countries showing annual incidence of 0.068–1.3 per 100,000 people and prevalence 0.22–8.5 per 100,000; given that PSC is closely linked with ulcerative colitis, the risk is likely higher in populations where UC is more common. In the United States, an estimated 29,000 individuals have PSC.

== Research ==
Although no curative treatment is known, several clinical trials are underway that aim to slow progression of this liver disease. Obeticholic acid is being investigated as a possible treatment for PSC due to its antifibrotic effects. Simtuzumab is a monoclonal antibody against the profibrotic enzyme LOXL2 that is being developed as a possible therapy for PSC.

== Notable cases ==
- Chris Klug – professional snowboarder with PSC who had liver transplant
- Chris LeDoux – professional rodeo rider and country musician with PSC who died of cholangiocarcinoma
- Elena Baltacha – British professional tennis player, diagnosed with PSC at age 19 and died five months after being diagnosed with PSC-associated liver cancer at the age of 30
- Walter Payton – professional American Football player and humanitarian, died of complications of PSC
- Kieron Dyer – professional footballer
- James Redford – director and son of Robert Redford who underwent two liver transplants due to PSC
- Lars-Göran Petrov – Swedish death metal vocalist best known for his work with Entombed, died of cholangiocarcinoma in 2021.
