= Ascending cholangitis =

- Other names: acute cholangitis, cholangitis
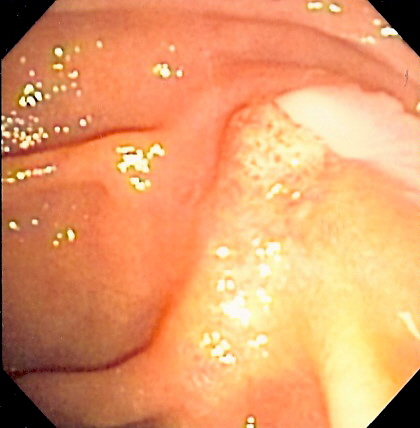
- Duodenoscopy image of pus extruding from the ampulla of Vater, indicative of cholangitis
- Specialty: Gastroenterology; General surgery
- Symptoms: jaundice, fever and abdominal pain

Ascending cholangitis, also known as acute cholangitis or simply cholangitis, is inflammation of the bile duct, usually caused by bacteria ascending from its junction with the duodenum (first part of the small intestine). It tends to occur if the bile duct is already partially obstructed by gallstones.

Cholangitis can be life-threatening, and is regarded as a medical emergency. Characteristic symptoms include yellow discoloration of the skin or whites of the eyes, fever, abdominal pain, and in severe cases, low blood pressure and confusion. Initial treatment is with intravenous fluids and antibiotics, but there is often an underlying problem (such as gallstones or narrowing in the bile duct) for which further tests and treatments may be necessary, usually in the form of endoscopy to relieve obstruction of the bile duct. The word is from Greek chol-, bile + ang-, vessel + -itis, inflammation.

== Signs and symptoms ==
Charcot's triad

A person with cholangitis may complain of abdominal pain (particularly in the right upper quadrant of the abdomen), fever, rigors (uncontrollable shaking) and a feeling of uneasiness (malaise). Some may report jaundice (yellow discoloration of the skin and the whites of the eyes).

Physical examination findings typically include jaundice and right upper quadrant tenderness. Charcot's triad is a set of three common findings in cholangitis: abdominal pain, jaundice, and fever. This was assumed in the past to be present in 50–70% of cases, although more recently the frequency has been reported as 15–20%. Reynolds' pentad includes the findings of Charcot's triad with the presence of septic shock and mental confusion. This combination of symptoms indicates worsening of the condition and the development of sepsis, and is seen less commonly still.

In the elderly, the presentation may be atypical; they may directly collapse due to sepsis without first showing typical features. Those with an indwelling stent in the bile duct (see below) may not develop jaundice.

== Causes ==
Bile duct obstruction, which is usually present in acute cholangitis, is generally due to gallstones. 10–30% of cases, however, are due to other causes such as benign stricturing (narrowing of the bile duct without an underlying tumor), postoperative damage or an altered structure of the bile ducts such as narrowing at the site of an anastomosis (surgical connection), various tumors (cancer of the bile duct, gallbladder cancer, cancer of the ampulla of Vater, pancreatic cancer, cancer of the duodenum), anaerobic organisms such as Clostridium and Bacteroides (especially in the elderly and those who have undergone previous surgery of the biliary system).

Parasites which may infect the liver and bile ducts may cause cholangitis; these include the roundworm Ascaris lumbricoides and the liver flukes Clonorchis sinensis, Opisthorchis viverrini and Opisthorchis felineus. In people with AIDS, a large number of opportunistic organisms has been known to cause AIDS cholangiopathy, but the risk has rapidly diminished since the introduction of effective AIDS treatment. Cholangitis may also complicate medical procedures involving the bile duct, especially ERCP. To prevent this, it is recommended that those undergoing ERCP for any indication receive prophylactic (preventative) antibiotics.

The presence of a permanent biliary stent (e.g. in pancreatic cancer) slightly increases the risk of cholangitis, but stents of this type are often needed to keep the bile duct patent under outside pressure.

== Pathogenesis ==
Diagram showing liver and related parts of the digestive system

Bile is produced by the liver, and serves to eliminate cholesterol and bilirubin from the body, as well as emulsifying of fats to make them more soluble in water and aid in their digestion. Bile is formed in the liver by hepatocytes (liver cells) and excreted into the common hepatic duct. Part of the bile is stored in the gall bladder because of back pressure (exerted by the sphincter of Oddi), and may be released at the time of digestion. The gallbladder also concentrates the bile by absorbing water and dissolved salts from it. All bile reaches the duodenum (first part of the small intestine) through the common bile duct and the ampulla of Vater. The sphincter of Oddi, located at the junction of the ampulla of Vater and the duodenum, is a circular muscle that controls the release of both bile and pancreatic secretions into the digestive tract.

The biliary tree is normally relatively free of bacteria because of certain protective mechanisms. The sphincter of Oddi acts as a mechanical barrier. The biliary system normally has low pressure (8 to 12 cmH_{2}O) and allows bile to flow freely through. The continuous forward flow of the bile in the duct flushes bacteria, if present, into the duodenum, and does not allow the establishment of an infection. The constitution of bile—bile salts and immunoglobulin secreted by the epithelium of the bile duct also has a protective role.

Bacterial contamination alone in absence of obstruction does not usually result in cholangitis. However increased pressure within the biliary system (above 20 cmH_{2}O) resulting from obstruction in the bile duct widens spaces between the cells lining the duct, bringing bacterially contaminated bile in contact with the blood stream. It also adversely affects the function of Kupffer cells, which are specialized macrophage cells that assist in preventing bacteria from entering the biliary system. Finally, increased biliary pressure decreases production of IgA immunoglobulins in the bile. This results in bacteremia (bacteria in the blood stream) and gives rise to the systemic inflammatory response syndrome (SIRS) comprising fever (often with rigors), tachycardia, increased respiratory rate and increased white blood cell count; SIRS in the presence of suspected or confirmed infection is called sepsis. Biliary obstruction itself disadvantages the immune system and impairs its capability to fight infection, by impairing the function of certain immune system cells (neutrophil granulocytes) and modifying the levels of immune hormones (cytokines).

In ascending cholangitis, it is assumed that organisms migrate backwards up the bile duct as a result of partial obstruction and decreased function of the sphincter of Oddi. Other theories about the origin of the bacteria, such as through the portal vein or transmigration from the colon, are considered less likely.

== Diagnosis ==
=== Blood tests ===
Routine blood tests show features of acute inflammation (raised white blood cell count and elevated C-reactive protein level), and usually abnormal liver function tests (LFTs). In most cases the LFTs will be consistent with obstruction: raised bilirubin, alkaline phosphatase and γ-glutamyl transpeptidase. In the early stages, however, pressure on the liver cells may be the main feature and the tests will resemble those in hepatitis, with elevations in alanine transaminase and aspartate transaminase.

Blood cultures are often performed in people with fever and evidence of acute infection. These yield the bacteria causing the infection in 36% of cases, usually after 24–48 hours of incubation. Bile, too, may be sent for culture during ERCP (see below). The most common bacteria linked to ascending cholangitis are gram-negative bacilli: Escherichia coli (25–50%), Klebsiella (15–20%) and Enterobacter (5–10%). Of the gram-positive cocci, Enterococcus causes 10–20%.

=== Medical imaging ===
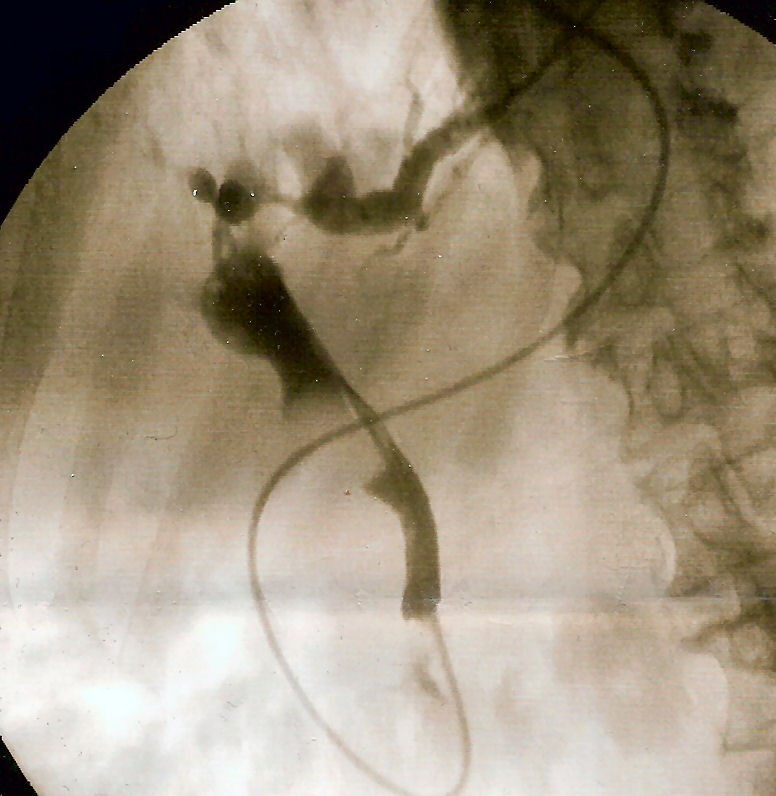
Cholangiogram through a nasobiliary drain showing the common bile duct in black (diagonally from top left to bottom right in the center) with an interruption in the contour due to a large gallstone.

Given that ascending cholangitis usually occurs in the setting of bile duct obstruction, various forms of medical imaging may be employed to identify the site and nature of this obstruction. The first investigation is usually ultrasound, as this is the most easily available. Ultrasound may show dilation of the bile duct and identifies 38% of bile duct stones; it is relatively poor at identifying stones farther down the bile duct. Ultrasound can help distinguish between cholangitis and cholecystitis (inflammation of the gallbladder), which has similar symptoms to cholangitis but appears differently on ultrasound. A better test is magnetic resonance cholangiopancreatography (MRCP), which uses magnetic resonance imaging (MRI); this has a comparable sensitivity to ERCP. Smaller stones, however, can still be missed on MRCP depending on the quality of the hospital's facilities.

The gold standard test for biliary obstruction is still endoscopic retrograde cholangiopancreatography (ERCP). This involves the use of endoscopy (passing a tube through the mouth into the esophagus, stomach and thence to the duodenum) to pass a small cannula into the bile duct. At that point, radiocontrast is injected to opacify the duct, and X-rays are taken to get a visual impression of the biliary system. On the endoscopic image of the ampulla, one can sometimes see a protuberant ampulla from an impacted gallstone in the common bile duct or the frank extrusion of pus from the common bile duct orifice. On the X-ray images (known as cholangiograms), gallstones are visible as non-opacified areas in the contour of the duct. For diagnostic purposes, ERCP has now generally been replaced by MRCP. ERCP is only used first-line in critically ill patients in whom delay for diagnostic tests is not acceptable; however, if the index of suspicion for cholangitis is high, an ERCP is typically done to achieve drainage of the obstructed common bile duct.

If other causes rather than gallstones are suspected (such as a tumor), computed tomography and endoscopic ultrasound (EUS) may be performed to identify the nature of the obstruction. EUS may be used to obtain biopsy (tissue sample) of suspicious masses. EUS may also replace diagnostic ERCP for stone disease, although this depends on local availability.

== Treatment ==
=== Fluids and antibiotics ===
Cholangitis requires admission to hospital. Intravenous fluids are administered, especially if the blood pressure is low, and antibiotics are commenced. Empirical treatment with broad-spectrum antibiotics is usually necessary until it is known for certain which pathogen is causing the infection, and to which antibiotics it is sensitive. Combinations of penicillins and aminoglycosides are widely used, although ciprofloxacin has been shown to be effective in most cases, and may be preferred to aminoglycosides because of fewer side effects. Metronidazole is often added to specifically treat the anaerobic pathogens, especially in those who are very ill or at risk of anaerobic infections. Antibiotics are continued for 7–10 days. Drugs that increase the blood pressure (vasopressors) may also be required to counter the low blood pressure.

=== Endoscopy ===
The definitive treatment for cholangitis is relief of the underlying biliary obstruction. This is usually deferred until 24–48 hours after admission, when the patient is stable and has shown some improvement with antibiotics, but may need to happen as an emergency in case of ongoing deterioration despite adequate treatment, or if antibiotics are not effective in reducing the signs of infection (which happens in 15% of cases).

Endoscopic retrograde cholangiopancreatography (ERCP) is the most common approach in unblocking the bile duct. This involves endoscopy (passing a fiberoptic tube through the stomach into the duodenum), identification of the ampulla of Vater and insertion of a small tube into the bile duct. A sphincterotomy (making a cut in the sphincter of Oddi) is typically done to ease the flow of bile from the duct and to allow insertion of instruments to extract gallstones that are obstructing the common bile duct; alternatively or additionally, the common bile duct orifice can be dilated with a balloon. Stones may be removed either by direct suction or by using various instruments, including balloons and baskets to trawl the bile duct in order to pull stones into the duodenum. Obstructions that are caused by larger stones may require the use of an instrument known as a mechanical lithotriptor in order to crush the stone prior to removal. Obstructing stones that are too large to be removed or broken mechanically by ERCP may be managed by extracorporeal shock wave lithotripsy. This technique uses acoustic shock waves administered outside the body to break down the stones. An alternative technique to remove very large obstructing stones is electrohydraulic lithotripsy, where a small endoscope known as a cholangioscope is inserted by ERCP to directly visualize the stone. A probe uses electricity to generate shock waves that break down the obstructing stone. Rarely, surgical exploration of the common bile duct (termed choledochotomy), which can be performed with laparoscopy, is required to remove the stone.

Narrowed areas may be bridged by a stent, a hollow tube that keeps the duct open. Removable plastic stents are used in uncomplicated gallstone disease, while permanent self-expanding metal stents with a longer lifespan are used if the obstruction is due to pressure from a tumor such as pancreatic cancer. A nasobiliary drain may be left behind; this is a plastic tube that passes from the bile duct through the stomach and the nose and allows continuous drainage of bile into a receptible. It is similar to a nasogastric tube, but passes into the common bile duct directly, and allows for serial x-ray cholangiograms to be done to identify the improvement of the obstruction. The decision on which of the aforementioned treatments to apply is generally based on the severity of the obstruction, findings on other imaging studies, and whether the patient has improved with antibiotic treatment. Certain treatments may be unsafe if blood clotting is impaired, as the risk of bleeding (especially from sphincterotomy) is increased in the use of medication such as clopidogrel (which inhibits platelet aggregation) or if the prothrombin time is significantly prolonged. For a prolonged prothrombin time, vitamin K or fresh frozen plasma may be administered to reduce bleeding risk.

=== Percutaneous biliary drainage ===
In cases where a person is too ill to tolerate endoscopy or when a retrograde endoscopic approach fails to access the obstruction, a percutaneous transhepatic cholangiogram (PTC) may be performed to evaluate the biliary system for placement of a percutaneous biliary drain (PBD). This is often necessary in the case of a proximal stricture or a bilioenteric anastomosis (a surgical connection between the bile duct and small bowel, such as the duodenum or jejunum). Once access across the stricture is obtained, balloon dilation can be performed and stones can be swept forward into the duodenum. Due to potential complications of percutaneous biliary drain placement and the necessity of regular drain maintenance, a retrograde approach via ERCP remains first-line therapy.

=== Cholecystectomy ===
Not all gallstones implicated in ascending cholangitis actually originate from the gallbladder, but cholecystectomy (surgical removal of the gallbladder) is generally recommended in people who have been treated for cholangitis due to gallstone disease. This is typically delayed until all symptoms have resolved and ERCP or MRCP have confirmed that the bile duct is clear of gallstones. Those who do not undergo cholecystectomy have an increased risk of recurrent biliary pain, jaundice, further episodes of cholangitis, and need for further ERCP or cholecystostomy; the risk of death is also significantly increased.

== Biliary sepsis ==
Biliary sepsis is a systemic complication of acute cholangitis that occurs when infection spreads from the bile ducts into the bloodstream.

A systemic infection resulting from bacterial translocation from the biliary tract, most commonly due to acute cholangitis or suppurative cholecystitis. It is a life-threatening complication of biliary obstruction (e.g., choledocholithiasis, strictures) and requires urgent intervention.

== Prognosis ==
Acute cholangitis carries a significant risk of death, the leading cause being irreversible shock with multiple organ failure (a possible complication of severe infections). Improvements in diagnosis and treatment have led to a reduction in mortality: before 1980, the mortality rate was greater than 50%, but after 1980 it was 10–30%. Patients with signs of multiple organ failure are likely to die unless they undergo early biliary drainage and treatment with systemic antibiotics. Other causes of death following severe cholangitis include heart failure and pneumonia.

Risk factors indicating an increased risk of death include older age, female gender, a history of liver cirrhosis, biliary narrowing due to cancer, acute kidney injury and the presence of liver abscesses. Complications following severe cholangitis include kidney failure, respiratory failure (inability of the respiratory system to oxygenate blood and/or eliminate carbon dioxide), abnormal heart rhythms, wound infection, pneumonia, gastrointestinal bleeding and myocardial ischemia (lack of blood flow to the heart, leading to heart attacks).

== Epidemiology ==
In the Western world, about 15% of all people have gallstones in their gallbladder but the majority are unaware of this and have no symptoms. Over ten years, 15–26% will have one or more episodes of biliary colic (abdominal pain due to the passage of gallstones through the bile duct into the digestive tract), and 2–3% will develop complications of obstruction: acute pancreatitis, cholecystitis or acute cholangitis. Prevalence of gallstone disease increases with age and body mass index (a marker of obesity). However, the risk is also increased in those who lose weight rapidly (e.g. after weight loss surgery) due to alterations in the composition of the bile that makes it prone to form stones. Gallstones are slightly more common in women than in men, and pregnancy increases the risk further.

== History ==
Dr Jean-Martin Charcot, working at the Salpêtrière Hospital in Paris, France, is credited with early reports of cholangitis, as well as his eponymous triad, in 1877. He referred to the condition as "hepatic fever" (fièvre hépatique). Dr Benedict M. Reynolds, an American surgeon, reignited interest in the condition in his 1959 report with colleague Dr Everett L. Dargan, and formulated the pentad that carries his name. It remained a condition generally treated by surgeons, with exploration of the bile duct and excision of gallstones, until the ascendancy of ERCP in 1968. ERCP is generally performed by internal medicine or gastroenterology specialists. In 1992 it was shown that ERCP was generally safer than surgical intervention in ascending cholangitis.

== See also ==
- Primary sclerosing cholangitis (an autoimmune disease leading to narrowing of the bile ducts)
- Gallstone-related pancreatitis
