= Common bile duct stone =

Presence of gallstones in the common bile duct

- Other names: Choledocholithiasis
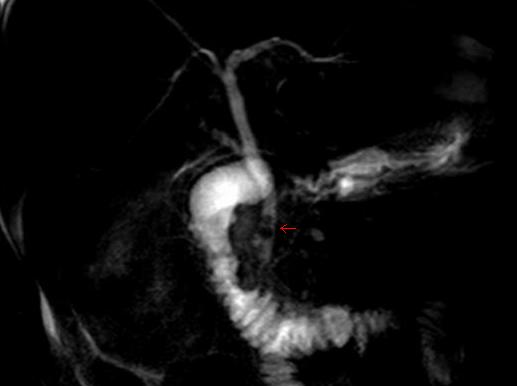
- Magnetic resonance cholangiopancreatography (MRCP) image of two gallstones in the distal common bile duct
- Specialty: Gastroenterology

Common bile duct stone, also known as choledocholithiasis, is the presence of gallstones in the common bile duct (CBD) (thus choledocho- + lithiasis). This condition can cause jaundice and liver cell damage. Treatments include choledocholithotomy and endoscopic retrograde cholangiopancreatography (ERCP).

== Signs and symptoms ==
Murphy's sign is commonly negative on physical examination in choledocholithiasis, helping to distinguish it from cholecystitis. Jaundice of the skin or eyes is an important physical finding in biliary obstruction. Jaundice and/or clay-colored stool may raise suspicion of choledocholithiasis or even gallstone pancreatitis. If the above symptoms coincide with fever and chills, the diagnosis of ascending cholangitis may also be considered.

More than 70% of people with gallstones are asymptomatic and are diagnosed incidentally during ultrasound. Studies have shown that 10% of those with gallstones will develop symptoms within 5 years of diagnosis, and 20% within 20 years.

== Causes ==
While stones can frequently pass through the common bile duct into the duodenum, some stones may be too large to pass through the common bile duct and may cause an obstruction. One risk factor for this is duodenal diverticulum.

== Pathophysiology ==
This obstruction may lead to jaundice, elevation in alkaline phosphatase, increase in conjugated bilirubin in the blood and increase in cholesterol in the blood. It can also cause acute pancreatitis and ascending cholangitis.

== Diagnosis ==
Choledocholithiasis (stones in common bile duct) is one of the complications of cholelithiasis (gallstones), so the initial step is to confirm the diagnosis of cholelithiasis. Patients with cholelithiasis typically present with pain in the right-upper quadrant of the abdomen with the associated symptoms of nausea and vomiting, especially after a fatty meal. The physician can confirm the diagnosis of cholelithiasis with an abdominal ultrasound that shows the ultrasonic shadows of the stones in the gallbladder.

Although unusual, it is possible to have a common bile duct stone despite prior cholecystectomy. One study found that in patients diagnosed with choledocholithiasis, 28% had undergone prior cholecystectomy. Such stones are thought to be the result of stones missed at the time of the cholecystectomy, as opposed to the formation of new stones.

The diagnosis of choledocholithiasis is suggested when the liver function blood test shows an elevation in bilirubin and serum transaminases. Other indicators include raised indicators of ampulla of vater (pancreatic duct obstruction) such as lipases and amylases. In prolonged cases the international normalized ratio (INR) may change due to a decrease in vitamin K absorption. (It is the decreased bile flow which reduces fat breakdown and therefore absorption of fat soluble vitamins). The diagnosis is confirmed with either a magnetic resonance cholangiopancreatography (MRCP), an endoscopic retrograde cholangiopancreatography (ERCP), or an intraoperative cholangiogram. If the patient must have the gallbladder removed for gallstones, the surgeon may choose to proceed with the surgery, and obtain a cholangiogram during the surgery. If the cholangiogram shows a stone in the bile duct, the surgeon may attempt to treat the problem by flushing the stone into the intestine or retrieve the stone back through the cystic duct.

On a different pathway, the physician may choose to proceed with ERCP before surgery. The benefit of ERCP is that it can be utilized not just to diagnose, but also to treat the problem. During ERCP the endoscopist may surgically widen the opening into the bile duct and remove the stone through that opening. ERCP, however, is an invasive procedure and has its own potential complications. Thus, if the suspicion is low, the physician may choose to confirm the diagnosis with MRCP, a non-invasive imaging technique, before proceeding with ERCP or surgery.

Common bile duct stone impacted at ampulla of Vater seen at time of endoscopic retrograde cholangiopancreatography (ERCP)

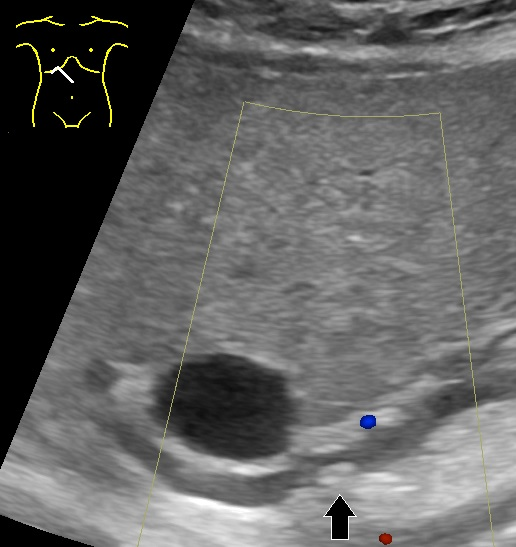
Abdominal ultrasonography of a common bile duct stone

Fluoroscopic image taken during endoscopic retrograde cholangiopancreatography (ERCP). Multiple gallstones are present in the gallbladder and cystic duct. The common bile duct and pancreatic duct appear to be unobstructed.

== Treatment ==
Treatment is removal of the gallstone from the bile duct using ERCP or an intraoperative cholangiogram. In these procedures, a thin tube is introduced into the common bile duct to perform a cholangiogram. If stones are identified, the surgeon inserts a tube with an inflatable balloon to widen the duct, and the stones are usually removed using either a balloon or tiny basket. A laser can be used to split big stones and make it easier to solve it using laparoscopy.

If the either of these procedures is unsuccessful, the stone can be removed during surgery through an incision into the bile duct at the location of the stone (called choledocholithotomy). This procedure may be used if the stone is very large or if the duct anatomy is complex.

Typically, the gallbladder is then removed, an operation called cholecystectomy, to prevent a future occurrence of common bile duct obstruction or other complications.
