= Papillary stenosis =

Medical condition

Papillary stenosis is a disturbance of the sphincter of Oddi, a muscular valve, that prevents the opening and release of bile or pancreatic fluids into the duodenum in response to food entering the duodenum.

Obstruction of the valve can cause:

- pancreatic pain
- jaundice – bile leaking back into the blood stream.
- attacks of pancreatitis

== Causes ==
- passage of stones
- scarring
- Gluten-sensitive enteropathy
- Autoimmune pancreatitis

== Diagnosis and treatment ==
- Endoscopic examination
- Usually treated surgically, usually involving papillotomy, that is, an incision in the sphincter.

== See also ==
- Sphincter of Oddi dysfunction
