= Charcot's cholangitis triad =

- Differential diagnosis: Ascending cholangitis

Charcot's cholangitis triad (English: /ʃɑːrˈkoʊ/ shar-KOH, French: [ʃaʁko]) is the combination of jaundice; fever, usually with rigors; and right upper quadrant abdominal pain. It occurs as a result of ascending cholangitis (an infection of the bile duct in the liver). When the presentation also includes low blood pressure and mental status changes, it is known as Reynolds' pentad. It is named after Jean-Martin Charcot.

== See also ==
- Charcot's neurologic triad (scanning speech, intention tremor, nystagmus) – a triad described in association with multiple sclerosis
- Reynolds' pentad
