= Endoscopic retrograde cholangiopancreatography =

Use of endoscopy and fluoroscopy to treat and diagnose digestive issues

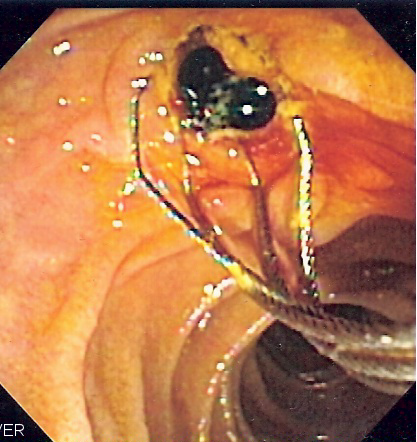
- Duodenoscopic image of two black pigment stones extracted from common bile duct after sphincterotomy
- Specialty: Gastroenterology
- ICD-9-CM: 51.10
- MeSH: D002760
- OPS-301 code: 1-642

Endoscopic retrograde cholangiopancreatography (ERCP) is a technique that combines the use of endoscopy and fluoroscopy to diagnose and treat certain problems of the biliary or pancreatic ductal systems. It is primarily performed by highly skilled and specialty trained gastroenterologists. Through the endoscope, the physician can see the inside of the stomach and duodenum, and inject a contrast medium into the ducts in the biliary tree and/or pancreas so they can be seen on radiographs.

ERCP is used primarily to diagnose and treat conditions of the bile ducts and main pancreatic duct, including gallstones, inflammatory strictures (scars), leaks (from trauma and surgery), and cancer. ERCP can be performed for diagnostic and therapeutic reasons, although the development of safer and relatively non-invasive investigations such as magnetic resonance cholangiopancreatography (MRCP) and endoscopic ultrasound has meant that ERCP is now rarely performed without therapeutic intent.

== Medical uses ==
=== Diagnostic ===
The following represent indications for ERCP, particularly if or when less invasive options are not adequate or definitive:

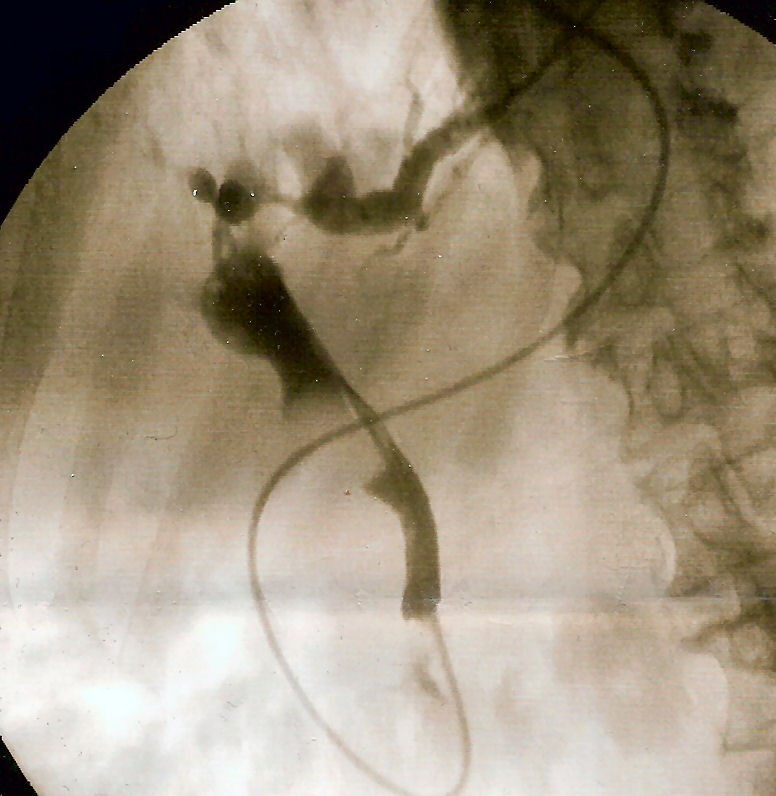
Fluoroscopic image of common bile duct stone seen at the time of ERCP. The stone is impacted in the distal common bile duct. A nasobiliary tube has been inserted.

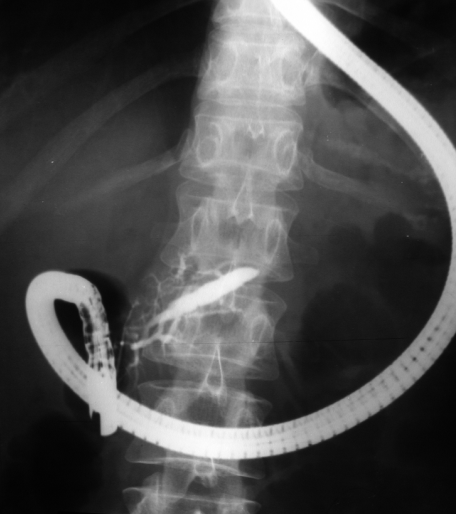
Fluoroscopic image showing dilatation of the pancreatic duct during ERCP investigation. Endoscope is visible.

- Obstructive jaundice – This may be due to several causes
  - Gallstones with dilated bile ducts on ultrasonography
  - Indeterminate biliary strictures and suspected bile duct tumors
  - Suspected injury to bile ducts either as a result of trauma or of iatrogenic origin
  - Sphincter of Oddi dysfunction
- Chronic pancreatitis is currently a controversial indication due to widespread availability of safer diagnostic modalities including endoscopic ultrasound, CT, and MRI/MRCP
- Pancreatic tumors no longer represent a valid diagnostic indication for ERCP unless they cause bile duct obstruction and jaundice. Endoscopic ultrasound represents a safer and more accurate diagnostic alternative

=== Therapeutic ===
ERCP may be indicated in the above diagnostic scenarios when any of the following are needed:

- Endoscopic sphincterotomy of the sphincter of Oddi
- Extraction of gallstones or other biliary debris
- Insertion of a stent through the major duodenal papilla and ampulla of Vater into the common bile duct and/or the pancreatic duct
- Dilation of strictures (e.g. primary sclerosing cholangitis, anastomotic strictures after liver transplantation)
- Extraction of liver flukes from the biliary system (e.g., opisthorchiasis, clonorchiasis, fasciolosis)

== Contraindications ==
- Acute pancreatitis (unless persistently elevated or rising bilirubin suggests ongoing obstruction)
- (Irreversible) coagulation disorder if sphincterotomy planned
- Recent myocardial infarction or pulmonary embolism
- Severe cardiopulmonary disease or other serious morbidity

Hypersensitivity to iodinated contrast medium or a history of iodinated contrast dye anaphylaxis is not a contraindication of ERCP, though it should be discussed with your health provider, and you should tell them you are allergic to iodine, as an alternative contrast iodine-free material ("dye") is then injected gently into the ducts (pancreatic or biliary) and x-rays are taken.

== Procedure ==
Diagram of an endoscopic retrograde cholangiopancreatography (ERCP)

The patient is sedated or anaesthetized. Then a flexible camera (endoscope) is inserted through the mouth, down the esophagus, into the stomach, through the pylorus into the duodenum where the ampulla of Vater (the union of the common bile duct and pancreatic duct) exists. The sphincter of Oddi is a muscular valve that controls the opening to the ampulla. The region can be directly visualized with the endoscopic camera while various procedures are performed. A plastic catheter or cannula is inserted through the ampulla, and radiocontrast is injected into the bile ducts and/or pancreatic duct. Fluoroscopy is used to look for blockages, or other lesions such as stones.

When needed, the sphincters of the ampulla and bile ducts can be enlarged by a cut (sphincterotomy) with an electrified wire called a sphincterotome for access into either so that gallstones may be removed or other therapy performed.

Other procedures associated with ERCP include the trawling of the common bile duct with a basket or balloon to remove gallstones and the insertion of a plastic stent to assist the drainage of bile. Also, the pancreatic duct can be cannulated and stents be inserted.

The pancreatic duct requires visualisation in cases of pancreatitis. Ultrasound is frequently the first investigation performed on admission; although it has little value in the diagnosis of pancreatitis or its complications. contrast-enhanced computed tomography (MD-CECT) is the most used imaging technique. However, magnetic resonance imaging (MRI) offers diagnostic capabilities similar to those of CT, with additional intrinsic advantages including lack of ionizing radiation and exquisite soft tissue characterization.

In specific cases, other specialized or ancillary endoscopes may be used for ERCP. These include mother-baby and SpyGlass cholangioscopes (to help in diagnosis by directly visualizing the duct as opposed to only obtaining X-ray images) as well as balloon enteroscopes (e.g. in patients that have previously undergone digestive system surgery with post-Whipple or Roux-en-Y surgical anatomy).

== Risks ==
One of the most frequent and feared complications after endoscopic retrograde cholangiopancreatography (ERCP) is post-ERCP pancreatitis (PEP). In previous studies, the incidence of PEP has been estimated at 3.5 to 5%. According to Cotton et al., PEP is defined as a "clinical pancreatitis with amylase at least three times the upper limit of normal at more than 24 hours after the procedure requiring hospital admission or prolongation of planned admission". Grading of severity of PEP is mainly based on the length of hospital stay.

Risk factors for developing PEP include technical matters related to the ERCP procedure and patient-specific ones. The technical factors include manipulation of and injection of contrast into the pancreatic duct, cannulation attempts lasting more than five minutes, and biliary balloon sphincter dilation; among patient-related factors are female gender, younger age, and Sphincter of Oddi dysfunction. A systematic review of clinical trials concluded that a previous history of PEP or pancreatitis significantly increases the risk for PEP to 17.8% and to 5.5% respectively.

Intestinal perforation is a risk of any gastroenterologic endoscopic procedure, and is an additional risk if a sphincterotomy is performed. As the second part of the duodenum is anatomically in a retroperitoneal location (that is, behind the peritoneal structures of the abdomen), perforations due to sphincterotomies are retroperitoneal. Sphincterotomy is also associated with a risk of bleeding. ERCP may provoke hemobilia from trauma to friable hilar tumors or a guide-wire penetrating the bile duct wall, creating a biliary fistula. Delayed bleeding is a rare but potentially serious complication of sphincterotomy, particularly as many patients are discharged home within hours of ERCP.

There is also a risk associated with the contrast dye in patients who are allergic to compounds containing iodine, which can be very severe, even if the anaphylactoid reactions occur while patients are in a hospital.

Oversedation can result in dangerously low blood pressure, respiratory depression, nausea, and vomiting.

Other complications (less than 1%) may include heart and lung problems, infection in the bile duct called cholangitis, that can be life-threatening, and is regarded as a medical emergency. Using antibiotics before the procedure shows some benefits to prevent cholangitis and septicaemia. In rare cases, ERCP can cause fatal complications.

Cases of hospital-acquired (i.e., nosocomial) infections with carbapenem resistant enterobacteriaceae linked to incompletely disinfected duodenoscopes have occurred in the U.S. since at least 2009 per the Food and Drug Administration. Outbreaks were reported from Virginia Mason Hospital in Seattle in 2013, UCLA Health System Los Angeles in 2015, Chicago and Pittsburgh. The FDA issued a safety communication "Design of ERCP Duodenoscopes May Impede Effective Cleaning" in February 2015, which was updated in December 2015, and more recently in 2022 which recommended disposable components.

Prevalence of vitamin K and vitamin D deficiency, as bile is to assist in the breakdown and absorption of fat in the intestinal tract; a relative deficiency of bile can lead to fat malabsorption and deficiencies of fat-soluble vitamins.

== See also ==
- Percutaneous transhepatic cholangiography
- Reynolds' pentad
- Charcot's cholangitis triad
- Primary sclerosing cholangitis
