= Gallstone =

Disease where stones form in the gallbladder

- Other names: Gallstone disease, cholelith, cholecystolithiasis (gallstone in the gallbladder), choledocholithiasis (gallstone in a bile duct)
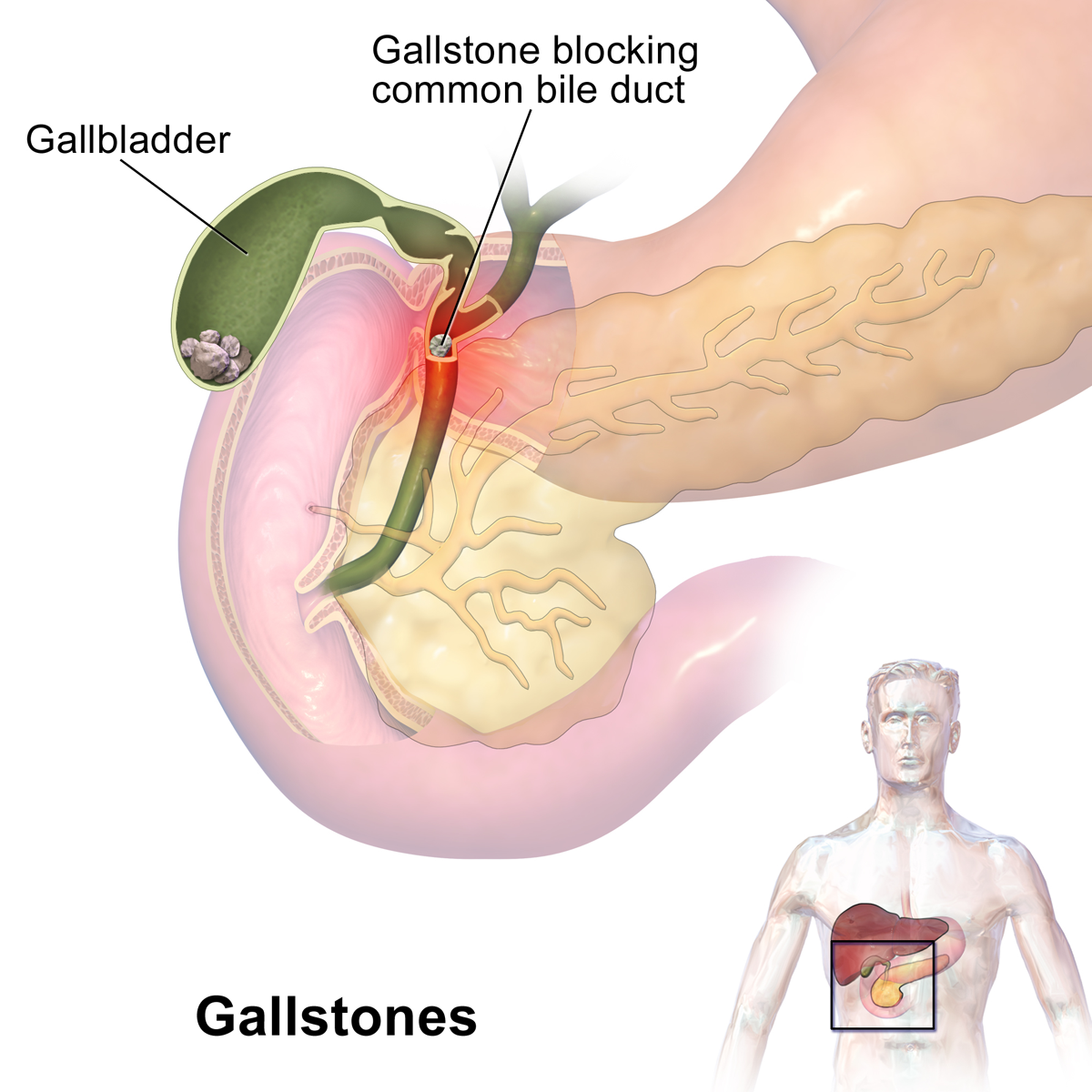
- Gallstones typically form in the gallbladder and may result in symptoms if they block the biliary system.
- Pronunciation: Cholelith /ˈkoʊləlɪθ/, cholelithiasis /ˌkoʊləlɪˈθaɪəsɪs/
- Specialty: Gastroenterology; General surgery
- Symptoms: None, crampy pain in the right upper abdomen
- Complications: Inflammation of the gallbladder, inflammation of the pancreas, liver inflammation
- Usual onset: After 40 years old
- Risk factors: Birth control pills, pregnancy, family history, obesity, diabetes, liver disease, rapid weight loss
- Diagnostic method: Based on symptoms and physical examination, confirmed by ultrasound
- Prevention: Healthy weight, diet high in fiber, diet low in simple carbohydrates
- Treatment: Asymptomatic: none, ursodeoxycholic acid (UDCA) and Chenodeoxycholic acid Pain: surgery ERCP, Cholecystectomy
- Prognosis: Good after surgery
- Frequency: 10–15% of adults (developed world)

A gallstone is a stone formed within the gallbladder from precipitated bile components. The term cholelithiasis may refer to the presence of gallstones or to any disease caused by gallstones, and choledocholithiasis refers to the presence of migrated gallstones within bile ducts.

Most people with gallstones (about 80%) are asymptomatic. However, when a gallstone obstructs the bile duct and causes acute cholestasis, a reflexive smooth muscle spasm often occurs, resulting in an intense cramp-like visceral pain in the right upper part of the abdomen known as a biliary colic (or "gallbladder attack"). This happens in 1–4% of those with gallstones each year. Complications from gallstones may include inflammation of the gallbladder (cholecystitis), inflammation of the pancreas (pancreatitis), obstructive jaundice, and infection in bile ducts (cholangitis). Symptoms of these complications may include pain that lasts longer than five hours, fever, yellowish skin, vomiting, dark urine, and pale stools.

Risk factors for gallstones include birth control pills, pregnancy, a family history of gallstones, obesity, diabetes, liver disease, or rapid weight loss. The bile components that form gallstones include cholesterol, bile salts, and bilirubin. Gallstones formed mainly from cholesterol are termed cholesterol stones, and those formed mainly from bilirubin are termed pigment stones. Gallstones may be suspected based on symptoms. Diagnosis is then typically confirmed by ultrasound. Complications may be detected using blood tests.

The risk of gallstones may be decreased by maintaining a healthy weight with exercise and a healthy diet. If there are no symptoms, treatment is usually not needed. In those who are having gallbladder attacks, surgery to remove the gallbladder is typically recommended. This can be carried out either through several small incisions or through a single larger incision, usually under general anesthesia. In rare cases when surgery is not possible, medication can be used to dissolve the stones or lithotripsy can be used to break them down.

In developed countries, 10–15% of adults experience gallstones. Gallbladder and biliary-related diseases occurred in about 104 million people (1.6% of people) in 2013 and resulted in 106,000 deaths. Gallstones are more common among women than men and occur more commonly after the age of 40. Gallstones occur more frequently among certain ethnic groups than others. For example, 48% of Native Americans experience gallstones, whereas gallstone rates in many parts of Africa are as low as 3%. Once the gallbladder is removed, outcomes are generally positive.

== Definition ==
Gallstone disease refers to the condition where gallstones are either in the gallbladder or common bile duct. The presence of stones in the gallbladder is referred to as cholelithiasis, from the Greek chole- (χολή, 'bile') + lith- (λίθος, 'stone') + -iasis (ἴασις, 'process'). The presence of gallstones in the common bile duct is called choledocholithiasis, from the Greek choledocho- (χοληδόχος, 'bile-containing', from chol- + docho-, 'duct') + lith- + -iasis. Choledocholithiasis is frequently associated with obstruction of the bile ducts, which can lead to cholangitis, from the Greek: chol- + ang- (ἄγγος, 'vessel') + -itis (-ῖτις, 'inflammation'), a serious infection of the bile ducts. Gallstones within the ampulla of Vater can obstruct the exocrine system of the pancreas and can result in pancreatitis.

== Signs and symptoms ==
The proportion of people with gallstones who experience symptoms as a result of them

Gallstones, regardless of size or number, are asymptomatic in 60–80% of patients. These "silent stones" do not require treatment and can remain asymptomatic even years after they form.

=== Biliary colic ===
Biliary colic, also known as symptomatic cholelithiasis, is what patients consider to be a "gallstone attack". These attacks occur when a gallstone blocks the opening to the cystic duct or the cystic duct itself, increasing the pressure inside the gallbladder as it contracts, which leads to pain. Patients typically experience sudden, severe pain in the right upper side of their abdomen or in the epigastric area (the upper, center part of the abdomen). This pain typically peaks approximately 1 hour after the onset and usually subsides completely within 5 hours. Sometimes, the pain may be referred to the right shoulder; this is called "Collin's sign". Patients may also experience nausea and vomiting. These attacks often occur after eating a fatty meal or at night. Of note, laboratory studies of AST, ALT, alkaline phosphatase, direct bilirubin, amylase, lipase, and white blood cell count are normal.

=== Complications ===
==== Acute cholecystitis ====
Acute cholecystitis, or inflammation of the gallbladder, is caused by gallstones in 90–95% of cases. It presents very similarly to biliary colic: a sudden onset of severe pain in the right upper side of the abdomen or epigastric area. However, this pain differs from a gallstone attack because it lasts more than 6 hours and does not subside like a normal attack would. In addition, patients also experience fever, decreased appetite, nausea, and vomiting. On physical exam, the patient can have an increased temperature, tachycardia (fast heart rate greater than 100 beats per minute), tenderness in the right upper quadrant (RUQ) of the abdomen, and a positive Murphy's sign. Murphy's sign, which is specific for acute cholecystitis, is the sudden stoppage of inspiration when deep pressure is applied to the RUQ. Laboratory studies typically show a moderately increased white blood cell count and normal to slightly elevated AST, ALT, alkaline phosphatase, and direct bilirubin.

==== Choledocholithiasis ====
Choledocholithiasis occurs when a gallstone obstructs the common bile duct. Patients typically experience right upper quadrant pain, back pain, jaundice (or yellowing of the skin), decreased appetite, nausea, vomiting, and fever. However, choledocholithiasis, just like gallstones, can also be asymptomatic. If the patient has symptoms, the physical exam is similar to that of acute cholecystitis. Laboratory studies show an increase in direct (conjugated) bilirubin, gamma-glutamyl transpeptidase (GGT), and alkaline phosphatase. AST and ALT can be elevated or normal.

==== Ascending cholangitis ====
Ascending cholangitis is a complication of choledocholithiasis. When a gallstone obstructs the common bile duct, inflammation and infection of the biliary tree can occur. Approximately 2/3 of patients present with the classic Charcot's triad: jaundice, fever or chills, and right upper quadrant pain. This can progress to septic shock, which presents as Reynold's pentad (Charcot's triad plus hypotension and altered mental status). Laboratory studies show an increase in white blood cell count, direct bilirubin, alkaline phosphatase, AST, and ALT.

==== Gallstone (biliary) pancreatitis ====
Pancreatitis is the inflammation of the pancreas. Gallstone pancreatitis occurs when a gallstone slips down the biliary tree and gets stuck in either the pancreatic duct or at the ampulla of Vater. Gallstone pancreatitis presents the same as acute pancreatitis: a sudden onset of epigastric pain that moves towards the back, decrease in appetite, nausea, and vomiting. Laboratory studies will show an elevated lipase, amylase, and white blood cell count.

==== Gallstone ileus ====
Large gallstones can potentially erode through the gallbladder wall and into the neighboring small intestine. This large stone then travels through the small intestine until it is too narrow for the stone to continue, causing a small bowel obstruction. This obstruction often occurs at previous surgical sites or at the ileocecal valve (the portion of the bowel where the small intestine meets the large intestine). The patient presents with the inability to defecate or pass gas, nausea, vomiting, and severe abdominal pain.

==== Cancer ====
Rarely, gallbladder cancer may occur as a complication in the setting of chronic gallstones.

== Risk factors ==
Gallstone risk increases for females (especially before menopause) and for people near or above 40 years; the condition is more prevalent among people of European or American Indigenous descent than among other ethnicities. A lack of melatonin could significantly contribute to gallbladder stones, as melatonin inhibits cholesterol secretion from the gallbladder, enhances the conversion of cholesterol to bile, and is an antioxidant, which is able to reduce oxidative stress to the gallbladder. Gilbert syndrome has been linked to an increased risk of gallstones. Researchers believe that gallstones may be caused by a combination of factors, including inherited body chemistry, body weight, gallbladder motility (movement), and low-calorie diet. The absence of such risk factors does not, however, preclude the formation of gallstones.

Nutritional factors that may increase risk of gallstones include constipation; eating fewer meals per day; low intake of the nutrients folate, magnesium, calcium, and vitamin C; low fluid consumption; and, at least for men, a high intake of carbohydrate, a high glycemic load, and high glycemic index diet. Wine and whole-grained bread may decrease the risk of gallstones.

Rapid weight loss increases risk of gallstones. The weight loss drug orlistat is known to increase the risk of gallstones.

Cholecystokinin deficiency caused by celiac disease increases risk of gallstone formation, especially when diagnosis of celiac disease is delayed.Pigment gallstones are most commonly seen in the developing world. Risk factors for pigment stones include hemolytic anemias (such as from sickle-cell disease and hereditary spherocytosis), cirrhosis, and biliary tract infections. People with erythropoietic protoporphyria (EPP) are at increased risk to develop gallstones. Additionally, prolonged use of proton pump inhibitors has been shown to decrease gallbladder function, potentially leading to gallstone formation.Cholesterol modifying medications can affect gallstone formation. Statins inhibit cholesterol synthesis and there is evidence that their use may decrease the risk of getting gallstones. Fibrates increase cholesterol concentration in bile and their use has been associated with an increased risk of gallstones. Bile acid malabsorption may also be a risk.

== Pathophysiology ==
Cholesterol gallstones develop when bile contains too much cholesterol and not enough bile salts. Besides a high concentration of cholesterol, two other factors are important in causing gallstones. The first is how often and how well the gallbladder contracts; incomplete and infrequent emptying of the gallbladder may cause the bile to become overconcentrated and contribute to gallstone formation. This can be caused by high resistance to the flow of bile out of the gallbladder due to the complicated internal geometry of the cystic duct. The second factor is the presence of proteins in the liver and bile that either promote or inhibit cholesterol crystallization into gallstones. In addition, increased levels of the hormone estrogen, as a result of pregnancy or hormone therapy, or the use of combined (estrogen-containing) forms of hormonal contraception, may increase cholesterol levels in bile and also decrease gallbladder motility, resulting in gallstone formation.

=== Composition ===
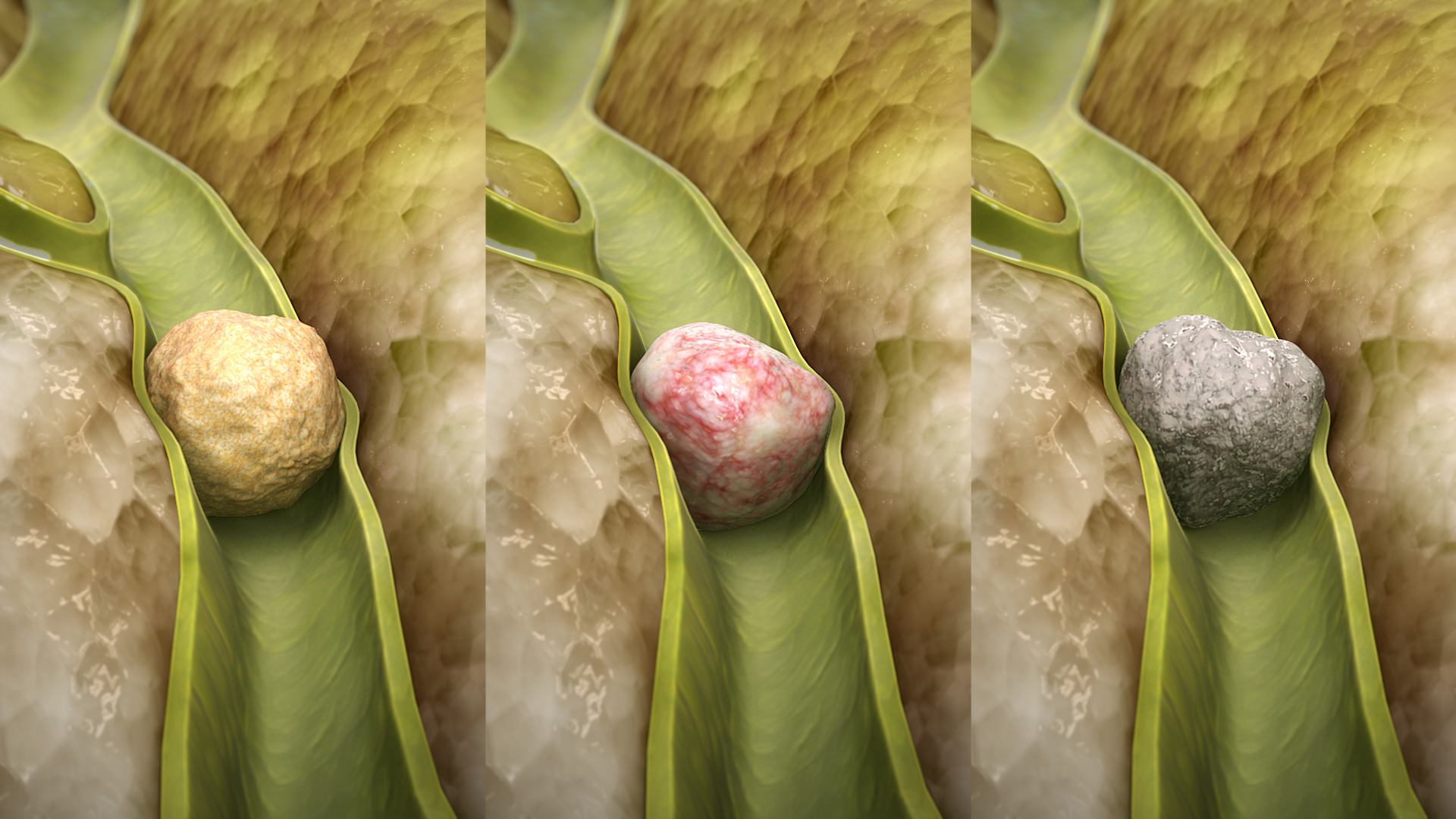
From left to right: cholesterol stone, mixed stone, pigment stone.

The composition of gallstones is affected by age, diet and ethnicity. On the basis of their composition, gallstones can be divided into the following types: cholesterol stones, pigment stones, and mixed stones. An ideal classification system is yet to be defined.

==== Cholesterol stones ====
Cholesterol stones vary from light yellow to dark green or brown or chalk white and are oval, usually solitary, between 2 and 3 cm long, each often having a tiny, dark, central spot. To be classified as such, they must be at least 80% cholesterol by weight (or 70%, according to the Japanese classification system). Between 35% and 90% of stones are cholesterol stones.

==== Pigment stones ====
Bilirubin ("pigment", "black pigment") stones are small, dark (often appearing black), and usually numerous. They are composed primarily of bilirubin (insoluble bilirubin pigment polymer) and calcium (calcium phosphate) salts that are found in bile. They contain less than 20% of cholesterol (or 30%, according to the Japanese classification system). Between 2% and 30% of stones are bilirubin stones.

==== Mixed stones ====
Mixed (brown pigment stones) typically contain 20–80% cholesterol (or 30–70%, according to the Japanese classification system). Other common constituents are calcium carbonate, palmitate phosphate, bilirubin and other bile pigments (calcium bilirubinate, calcium palmitate and calcium stearate). Because of their calcium content, they are often radiographically visible. They typically arise secondary to infection of the biliary tract which results in the release of β-glucuronidase (by injured hepatocytes and bacteria) which hydrolyzes bilirubin glucuronides and increases the amount of unconjugated bilirubin in bile. Between 4% and 20% of stones are mixed.

Gallstones can vary in size and shape from as small as a grain of sand to as large as a golf ball. The gallbladder may contain a single large stone or many smaller ones. Pseudoliths, sometimes referred to as sludge, are thick secretions that may be present within the gallbladder, either alone or in conjunction with fully formed gallstones.

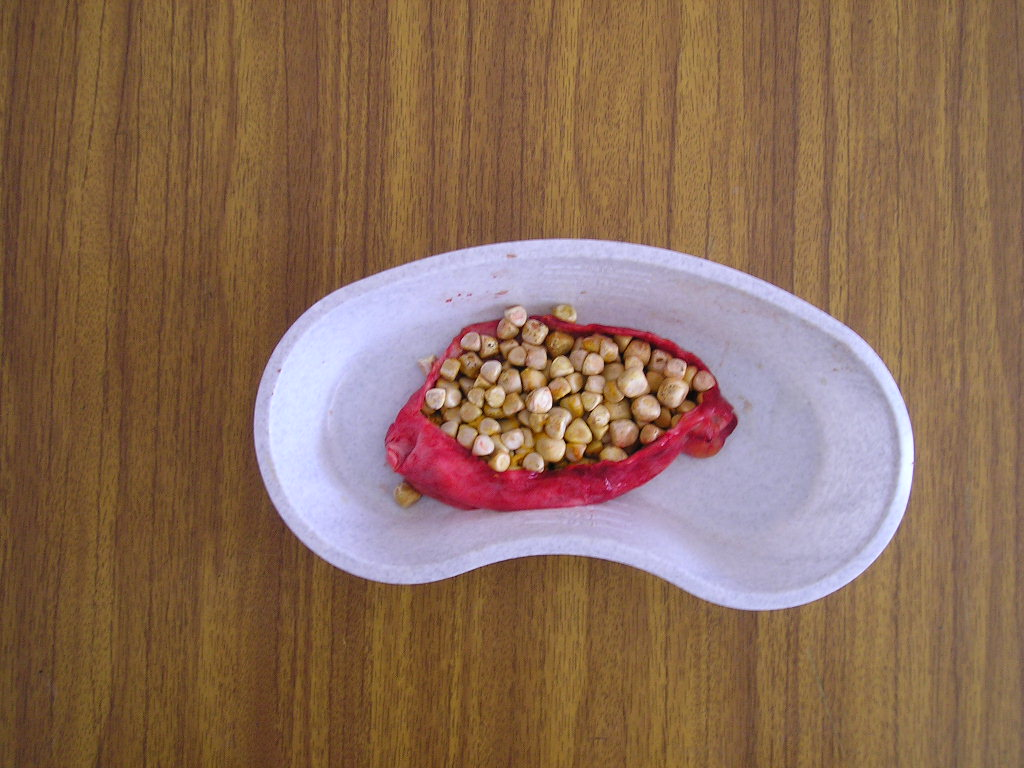
Gallbladder opened to show small cholesterol gallstones

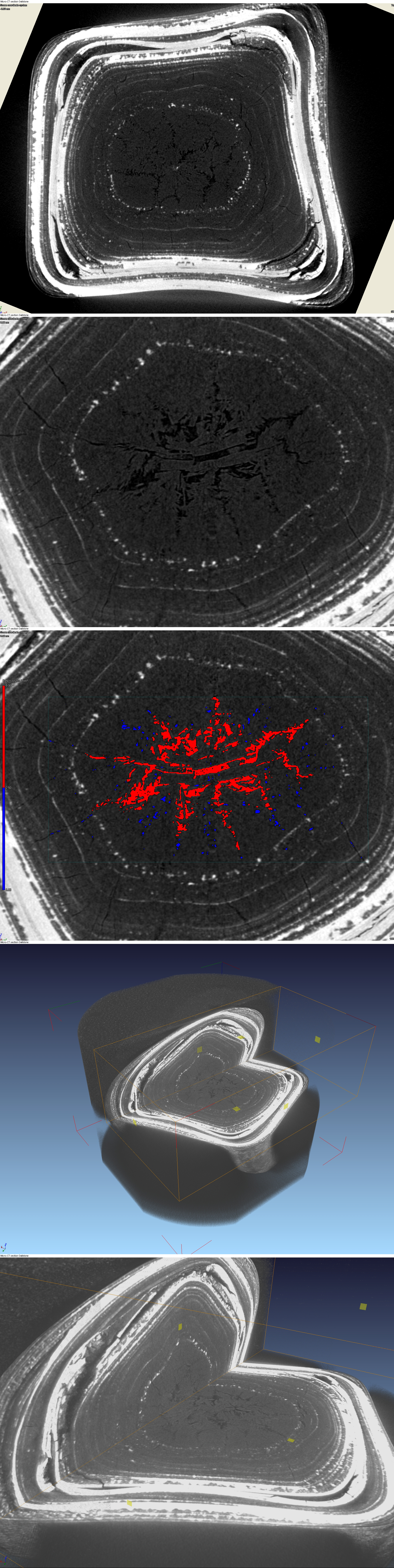
X-ray microtomograph of a gallstone

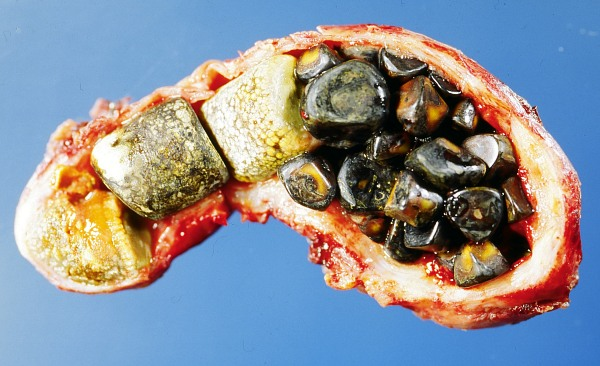
The large, yellow stone is largely cholesterol, while the green-to-brown stones are mostly composed of bile pigments

CT images of gallstones

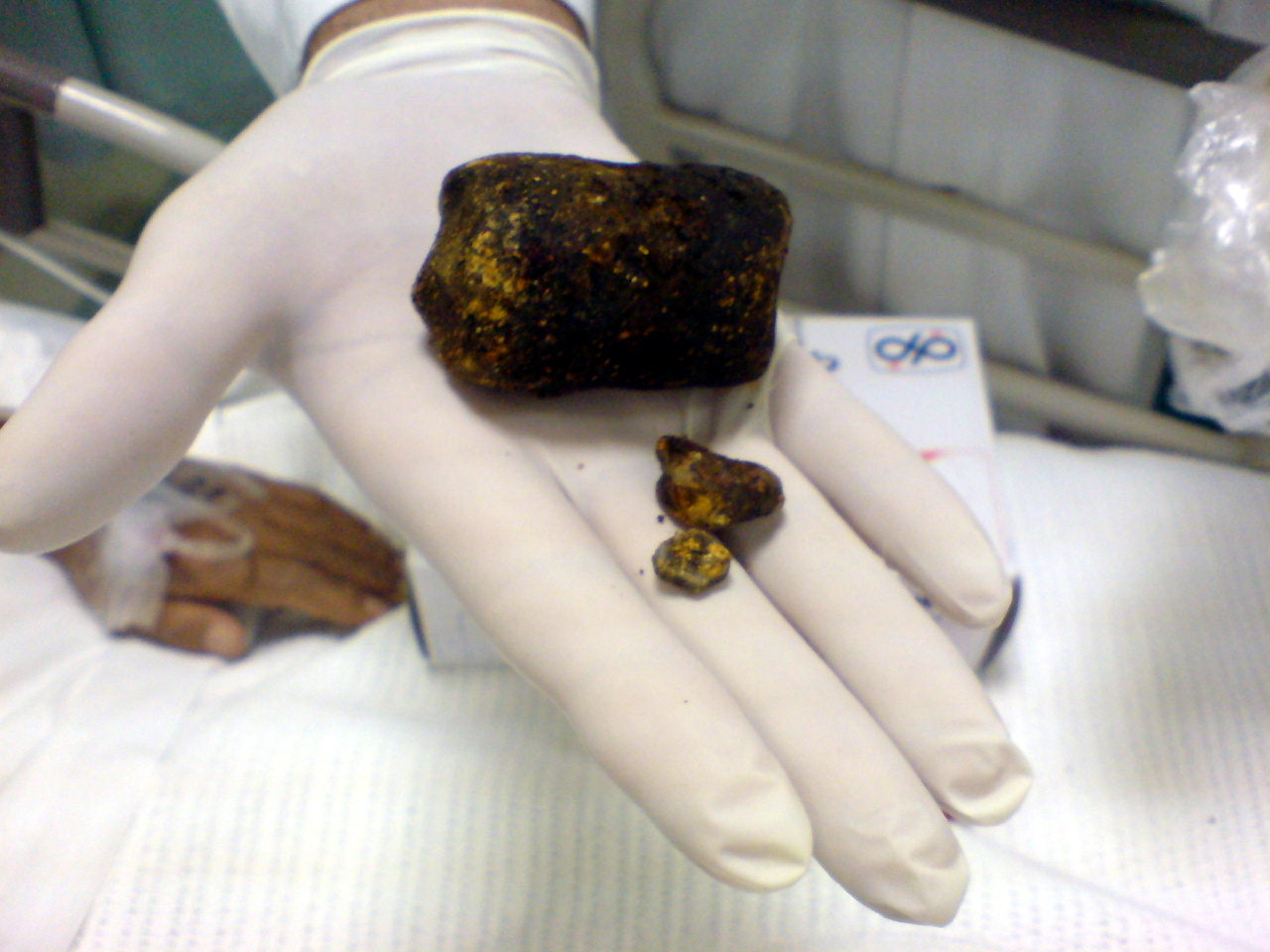
Large gallstone

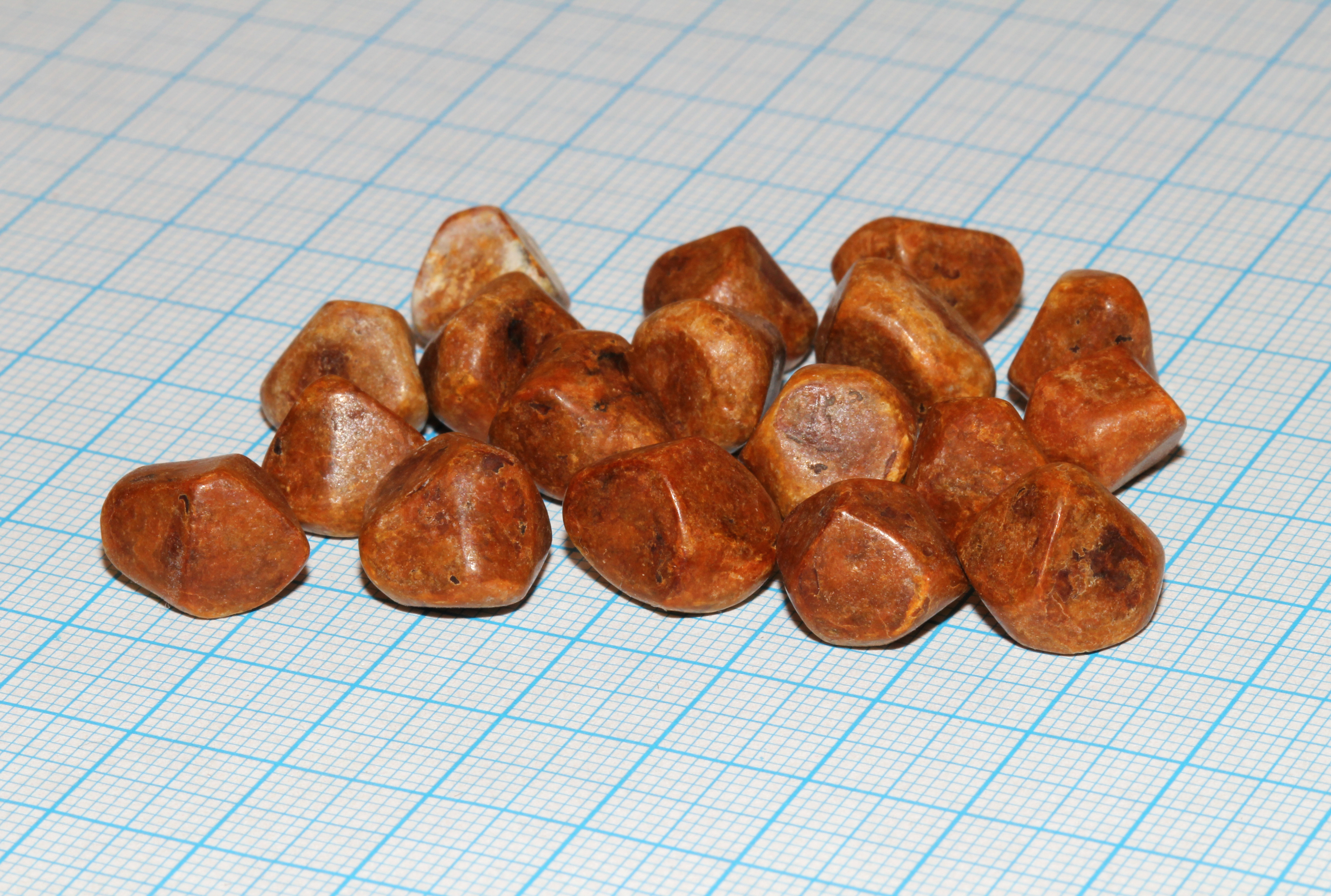
Numerous small gallstones made up largely of cholesterol

== Diagnosis ==
Diagnosis is typically confirmed by abdominal ultrasound. Other imaging techniques used are ERCP and MRCP. Gallstone complications may be detected on blood tests.

On abdominal ultrasound, sinking gallstones usually have posterior acoustic shadowing. In floating gallstones, reverberation echoes (or comet-tail artifact) is seen instead in a clinical condition called adenomyomatosis. Another sign is wall-echo-shadow (WES) triad (or double-arc shadow) which is also characteristic of gallstones.

A positive Murphy's sign is a common finding on physical examination during a gallbladder attack.

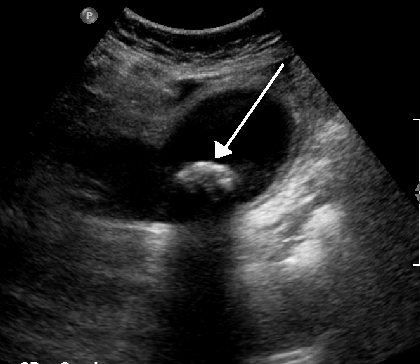
A 1.9 cm gallstone impacted in the neck of the gallbladder and leading to cholecystitis as seen on ultrasound. There is 4 mm gall bladder wall thickening.

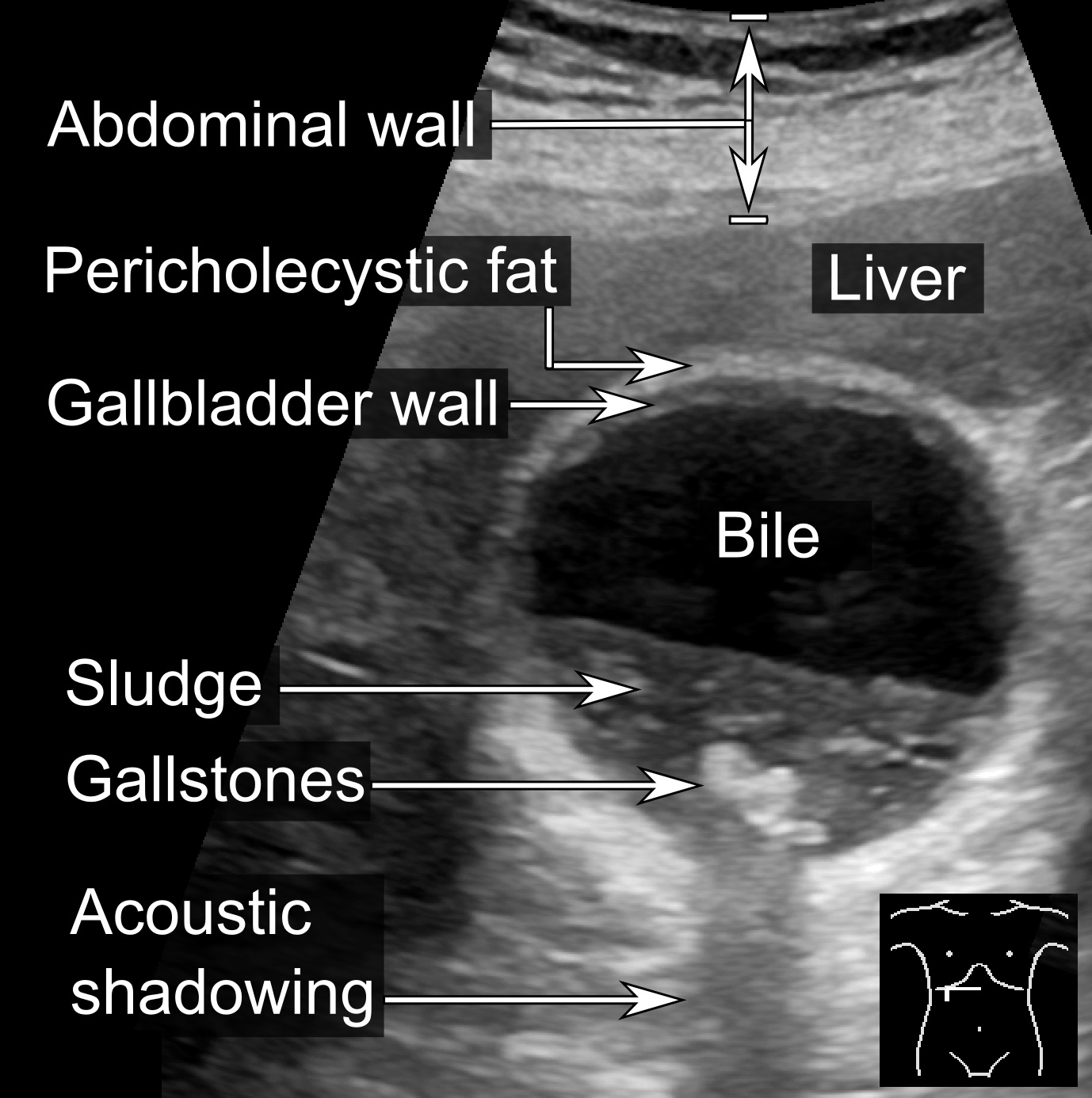
Biliary sludge and gallstones. There is borderline thickening of the gallbladder wall.

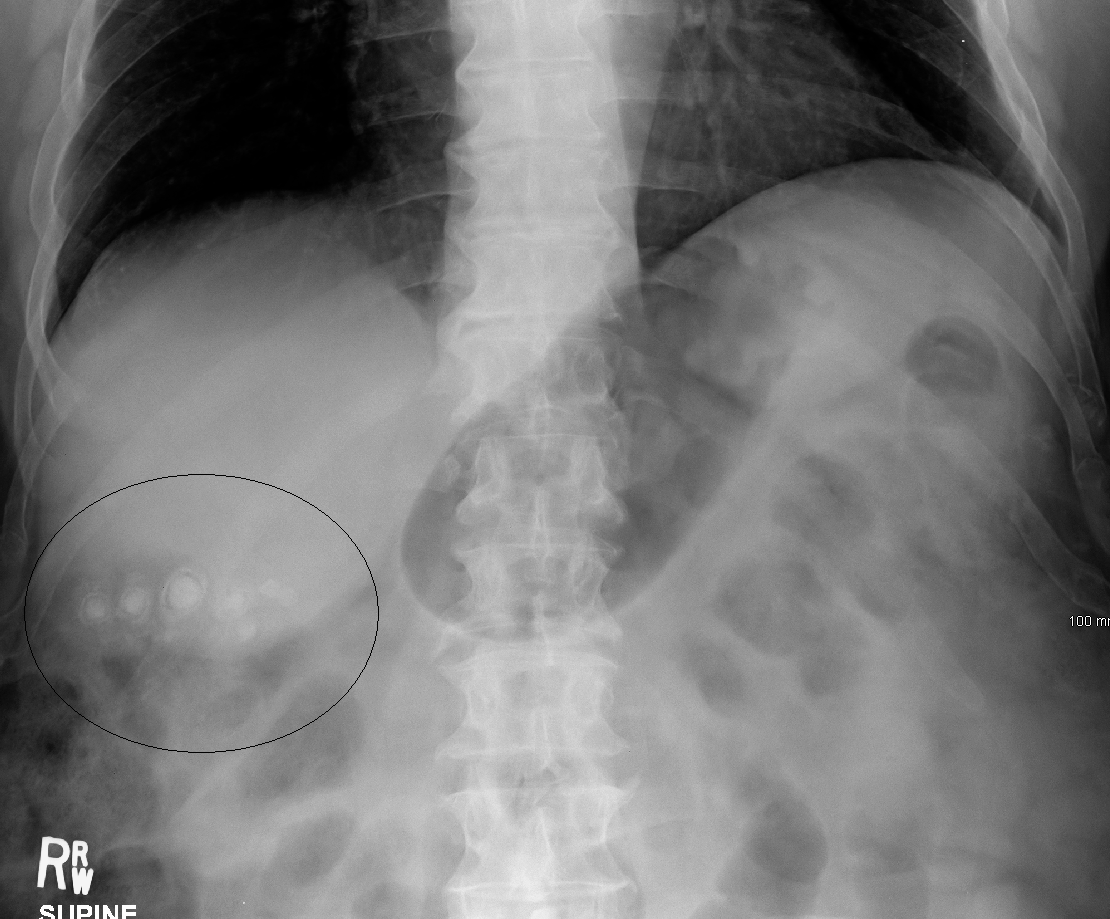
Gallstones as seen on plain X-ray

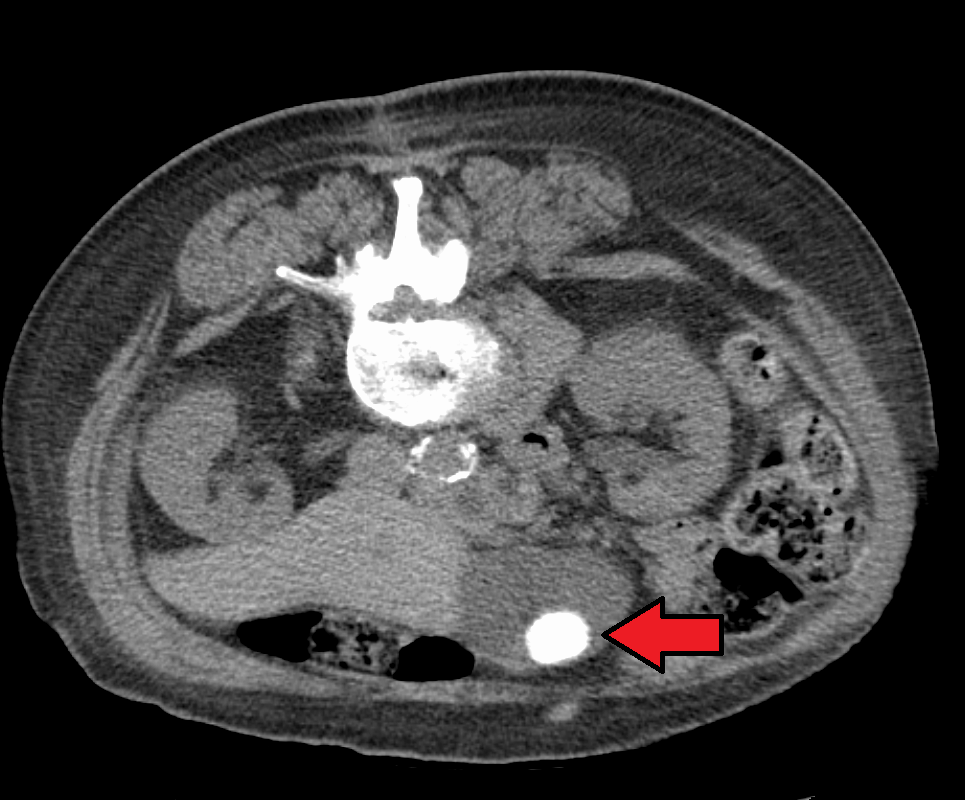
Large gallstone as seen on CT

A normal gallbladder on ultrasound with bowel peristalsis creating the false appearance of stones

== Prevention ==
Maintaining a healthy weight by getting sufficient exercise and eating a healthy diet that is high in fiber may help prevent gallstone formation.Ursodeoxycholic acid (UDCA) appears to prevent formation of gallstones during weight loss. A high fat diet during weight loss also appears to prevent gallstones.

== Treatment ==
=== Lithotripsy ===
Extracorporeal shock wave lithotripsy is a non-invasive method to manage gallstones that uses high-energy sound waves to disintegrate them first applied in January 1985. Side effects of extracorporeal shock wave lithotripsy include biliary pancreatitis and liver haematoma. The term is derived from the Greek words meaning 'breaking (or pulverizing) stones': litho- + τρίψω, tripso).

=== Surgical ===
Cholecystectomy (gallbladder removal) has a 99% chance of eliminating the recurrence of cholelithiasis. The lack of a gallbladder has no negative consequences in most people, however 10 to 15% of people develop postcholecystectomy syndrome, which may cause nausea, indigestion, diarrhea, and episodes of abdominal pain.

The outcomes of choosing to 'do nothing' (watchful waiting) and having cholecystectomy in the case of symptomatic gallstones, as shown in the NHS decision aid for gallstones. Data from.

There are two surgical options for cholecystectomy:

- Open cholecystectomy is performed via an abdominal incision (laparotomy) below the lower right ribs. Recovery typically requires 3–5 days of hospitalization, with a return to normal diet a week after release and to normal activity several weeks after release.
- Laparoscopic cholecystectomy, introduced in the 1980s, is performed via three to four small puncture holes for a camera and instruments. Post-operative care typically includes a same-day release or a one-night hospital stay, followed by a few days of home rest and pain medication. Perforation of the gall bladder is not uncommon—it has been reported in the range of 10% to 40%. Unretrieved gallstone spillage has been reported as 6% to 30%, but gallstones that are not retrieved rarely cause complications (0.08%–0.3%).

Risks of cholecystectomy.

Obstruction of the common bile duct with gallstones can sometimes be relieved by endoscopic retrograde sphincterotomy (ERS) following endoscopic retrograde cholangiopancreatography (ERCP).

Risks of ERCP.

Surgery carries risks and some people continue to experience symptoms (including pain) afterwards, for reasons that remain unclear. An alternative option is to adopt a 'watch and wait' strategy before operating to see if symptoms resolve. A study compared the 2 approaches for uncomplicated gallstones and after 18 months, both approaches were associated with similar levels of pain. The watch and wait approach was also less costly (more than £1000 less per patient).

=== Medical ===
The medications ursodeoxycholic acid (UDCA) and chenodeoxycholic acid (CDCA) have been used in treatment to dissolve gallstones. A 2013 meta-analysis concluded that UDCA or higher dietary fat content appeared to prevent formation of gallstones during weight loss. Medical therapy with oral bile acids has been used to treat small cholesterol stones, and for larger cholesterol gallstones when surgery is either not possible or unwanted. CDCA treatment can cause diarrhea, mild reversible hepatic injury, and a small increase in the plasma cholesterol level. UDCA may need to be taken for years.

== Use in alternative medicine ==
Gallstones can be a valued by-product of animals butchered for meat because of their use as an antipyretic and antidote in the traditional medicine of some cultures, particularly traditional Chinese medicine. The most highly prized gallstones tend to be sourced from old dairy cows, termed calculus bovis or niu-huang (yellow thing of cattle) in Chinese. Some slaughterhouses carefully scrutinize workers for gallstone theft.

== See also ==
- Mirizzi's syndrome
- Porcelain gallbladder
