= Cholangiography =

Imaging of the bile duct

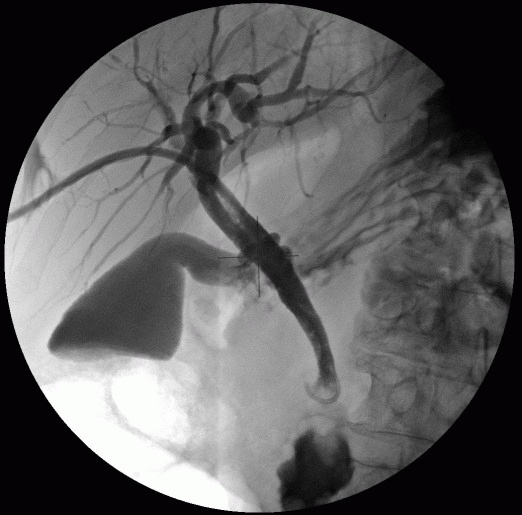
- Percutaneous transhepatic cholangiography
- ICD-9-CM: 87.5
- MeSH: D002758
- OPS-301 code: 3-13c

Cholangiography is the imaging of the bile duct (also known as the biliary tree) by x-rays and an injection of contrast medium.

== Types ==
There are at least four types of cholangiography:

1. Percutaneous transhepatic cholangiography (PTC): Examination of liver and bile ducts by x-rays. This is accomplished by the insertion of a thin needle into the liver carrying a contrast medium to help to see blockage in liver and bile ducts.
2. Endoscopic retrograde cholangiopancreatography (ERCP). Although this is a form of imaging, it is both diagnostic and therapeutic, and is often classified with surgeries rather than with imaging.
3. Primary cholangiography (or perioperative): Done in the operation room during a biliary drainage intervention.
4. Secondary cholangiography: Done after a biliary drainage intervention.

In both cases fluorescent fluids are used to create contrasts that make the diagnosis possible. Cholangiography has largely replaced the previously used method of intravenous cholangiography (IVC).

- Magnetic resonance cholangiopancreatography (MRCP) is another cholangiography method.
