= Chills =

- Specialty: Infectious disease

Chills is a feeling of coldness occurring usually during a high fever but sometimes alone in specific people. It occurs during fever as a result of the release of cytokines and prostaglandins as part of the inflammatory response, which increases the set point for body temperature in the hypothalamus. The increased set point causes the body temperature to rise (pyrexia), but also makes the patient feel chilled until the new set point is reached. The patient will also shiver because their body produces heat during muscle contraction in a physiological attempt to increase body temperature to the new set point. Chills not accompanying a high fever are normally mild.

A scare, especially one of fear, may cause a chill of medium power and short duration; this is commonly interpreted as or confused with trembling.

Severe chills with violent shivering are called rigors.

== Pathophysiology ==
Chills occur when the hypothalamic temperature set point is suddenly elevated for one or more of several causes, including tissue destruction, pyrogenic substances, or dehydration. Since the body temperature is below the new set point, body mechanisms of raising body temperature, including vasoconstriction, and shivering ensue. The patient experiences cold, even extreme cold, although they may have a body temperature higher than normal. As their temperature rises and reaches the new set point, chills stop and the patient feels neither hot nor cold. If the factor elevating their temperature is then removed, their hypothalamic set point decreases, triggering body cooling mechanisms to reduce body temperature to the new set point and causing sweating, which may be severe, and hot skin due to vasodilation. This phase of the febrile state is known as the "crisis" or the "flush."

In rats, prostaglandin E_{2} (PGE_{2}), a pyrogenic mediator produced in the brain during infection, has been shown to induce warmth-seeking behavior by enhancing cold-sensory transmission to the central amygdaloid nucleus (CeA), an emotion center of the limbic system. This mechanism potentially generates the unpleasant cold sensation of chills. This effect of PGE_{2} is mediated by EP3 receptors expressed in CeA-projecting neurons in the lateral parabrachial nucleus.

== See also ==
- Cold chill
- Goose bumps
- Night sweats
