= Reynolds' pentad =

- Differential diagnosis: obstructive ascending cholangitis

Reynolds' pentad is a collection of signs and symptoms consistent with obstructive ascending cholangitis, a serious infection of the biliary tract. It is a combination of Charcot's triad (right upper quadrant pain, jaundice, and fever) with shock (low blood pressure, tachycardia) and an altered mental status. Sometimes the two additional signs are listed simply as low blood pressure and confusion.

== Eponym ==
It was named after surgeon Benedict Reynolds, who described it (along with Everett Dargan) in 1959.
