= Endoscopic ultrasound =

Medical imaging procedure

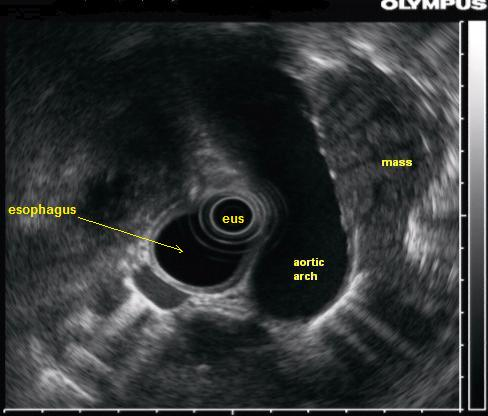
- In this endoscopic ultrasound image, a mass (in this case, from lung cancer) is visualized using an ultrasound probe (EUS) inserted into the esophagus.
- MeSH: D019160

Endoscopic ultrasound (EUS) or echoendoscopy is a medical procedure in which endoscopy (insertion of a probe into a hollow organ) is combined with ultrasound to obtain images of the internal organs in the chest, abdomen and colon. It can be used to visualize the walls of these organs, or to look at adjacent structures. Combined with Doppler imaging, nearby blood vessels can also be evaluated.

Endoscopic ultrasonography is most commonly used in the upper digestive tract and in the respiratory system. The procedure is performed by gastroenterologists or pulmonologists who have had extensive training. For the patient, the procedure feels almost identical to the endoscopic procedure without the ultrasound part, unless ultrasound-guided biopsy of deeper structures is performed.

== Digestive tract ==
=== Upper digestive tract ===
For endoscopic ultrasound of the upper digestive tract, a probe is inserted into the esophagus, stomach, and duodenum during a procedure called esophagogastroduodenoscopy. Among other uses, it allows for screening for pancreatic cancer, esophageal cancer, and gastric cancer, as well as benign tumors of the upper gastrointestinal tract. It also allows for characterization and biopsy of any focal lesions found in the upper gastrointestinal tract, such as esophageal tuberculosis. This is done by inserting a needle through the stomach lining into the target. Less commonly this procedure is used to identify malformations and masses in the bile ducts and pancreatic ducts.

Endoscopic ultrasound is performed with the patient sedated. The endoscope is passed through the mouth and advanced through the esophagus to the suspicious area. From various positions between the esophagus and duodenum, organs within and outside the gastrointestinal tract can be imaged to see if they are abnormal, and they can be biopsied by a process called fine needle aspiration. Organs such as the liver, pancreas, and adrenal glands are easily biopsied, as are any abnormal lymph nodes. In addition, the gastrointestinal wall itself can be imaged to see if it is abnormally thick, suggesting inflammation or malignancy.

The technique is highly sensitive for detection of pancreatic cancer (90–95% sensitivity), particularly in patients who are suspected to have a mass or present with jaundice. Its role in staging patients with pancreatic cancer is limited to local metastases; however, in combination with CT scan which provides information on regional metastases, it provides an excellent imaging modality for diagnosis and staging of pancreatic carcinoma.

Endoscopic ultrasound can also be used in conjunction with endoscopic retrograde cholangio pancreatography (ERCP). The ultrasound probe is used to locate gall stones which may have migrated into the common bile duct. This occurrence may cause obstruction of the drain shared by the liver and pancreas, which may lead to lower back pain, jaundice, and pancreatitis.

=== Lower digestive tract ===
Echo-endoscopy can also be used for imaging of the rectum and colon, although these applications are lesser known. It is used primarily to stage newly diagnosed rectal or anal cancer. EUS-guided fine needle aspiration may be used to sample lymph nodes during this procedure. Evaluation of the integrity of the anal sphincters may also be done during lower EUS procedures.

== Respiratory tract ==
An endoscopic ultrasound probe placed in the esophagus can also be used to visualize lymph nodes in the chest surrounding the airways (bronchi), which is important for the staging of lung cancer. Ultrasound can also be performed with an endoscopic probe inside the bronchi themselves, a technique known as endobronchial ultrasound.

== Technical aspects ==
The quality of the image produced is directly proportional to the frequency used. Therefore, a high frequency produces a better image. However, high frequency ultrasound does not penetrate as well as lower frequency ultrasound so that the examination of the nearby organs may be more difficult.

== See also ==
- Medical ultrasonography
