= Magnetic resonance cholangiopancreatography =

Medical imaging technique

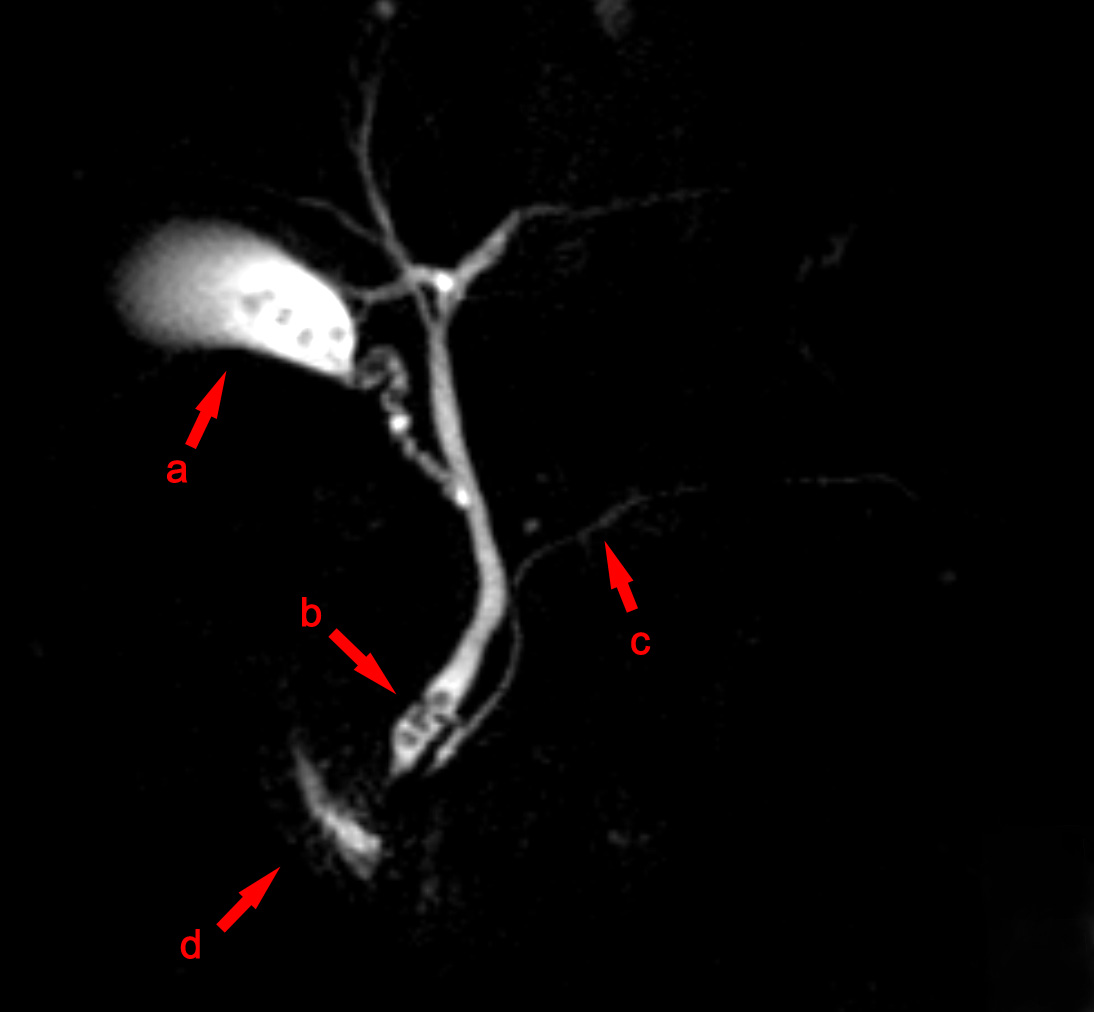
- MRCP image showing stones in the distal common bile duct: (a) Gallbladder with stones, (b) Stones in bile duct, (c) Pancreatic duct, (d) Duodenum.
- ICD-9-CM: 88.97
- MeSH: D049448
- OPS-301 code: 3-843

Magnetic resonance cholangiopancreatography (MRCP) is a medical imaging technique. It uses magnetic resonance imaging to visualize the biliary and pancreatic ducts non-invasively. This procedure can be used to determine whether gallstones are lodged in any of the ducts surrounding the gallbladder.

== Uses ==
MRCP has been slowly replacing endoscopic retrograde cholangiopancreatography (ERCP) as investigation of choice. MRCP is highly accurate in diagnosing the biliary system, pancreatic duct and accessing surrounding solid organs. Several advantages offered by MRCP is its non-invasive nature, less costly, requires less examination time when compared to ERCP (30 minutes), fewer staff required, and does not require any ionising radiation.

MRCP is used to diagnose gallstones. It can also diagnose choledochal cysts very reliably. Besides providing information regarding the biliary system, MRCP also provides information regarding surrounding solid organs and blood vessels, thus useful for planning the resection of pancreatic cancer and look for complications of primary sclerosing cholangitis such as liver cirrhosis and cholangiocarcinoma.

== Technique ==
Subject is needed to fast for at least four hours to ensure the biliary system is maximally distended with fluid while keeping the fluid in the gastrointestinal system at a minimum. However, clear fluid and routine medication is allowed before the scan. Negative oral contrast such as pineapple juice, date syrup, ferumoxsil, Açaí juice and water are useful in decreasing T2 signal intensity, thus minimising signals from stomach and duodenum from interfering with signals from the biliary system.

MRCP makes use of heavily T2-weighted MRI pulse sequences. These sequences show high signal in static or slow moving fluids within the gallbladder, biliary ducts and pancreatic duct, with low signal of surrounding tissue. Secretin is also given to a patient to increase ductal compliance, making imaging easier.

== History ==
It was introduced by Wallner in 1991.

== Additional images ==
Benign biliary stricture. 3D File generated from MRCP

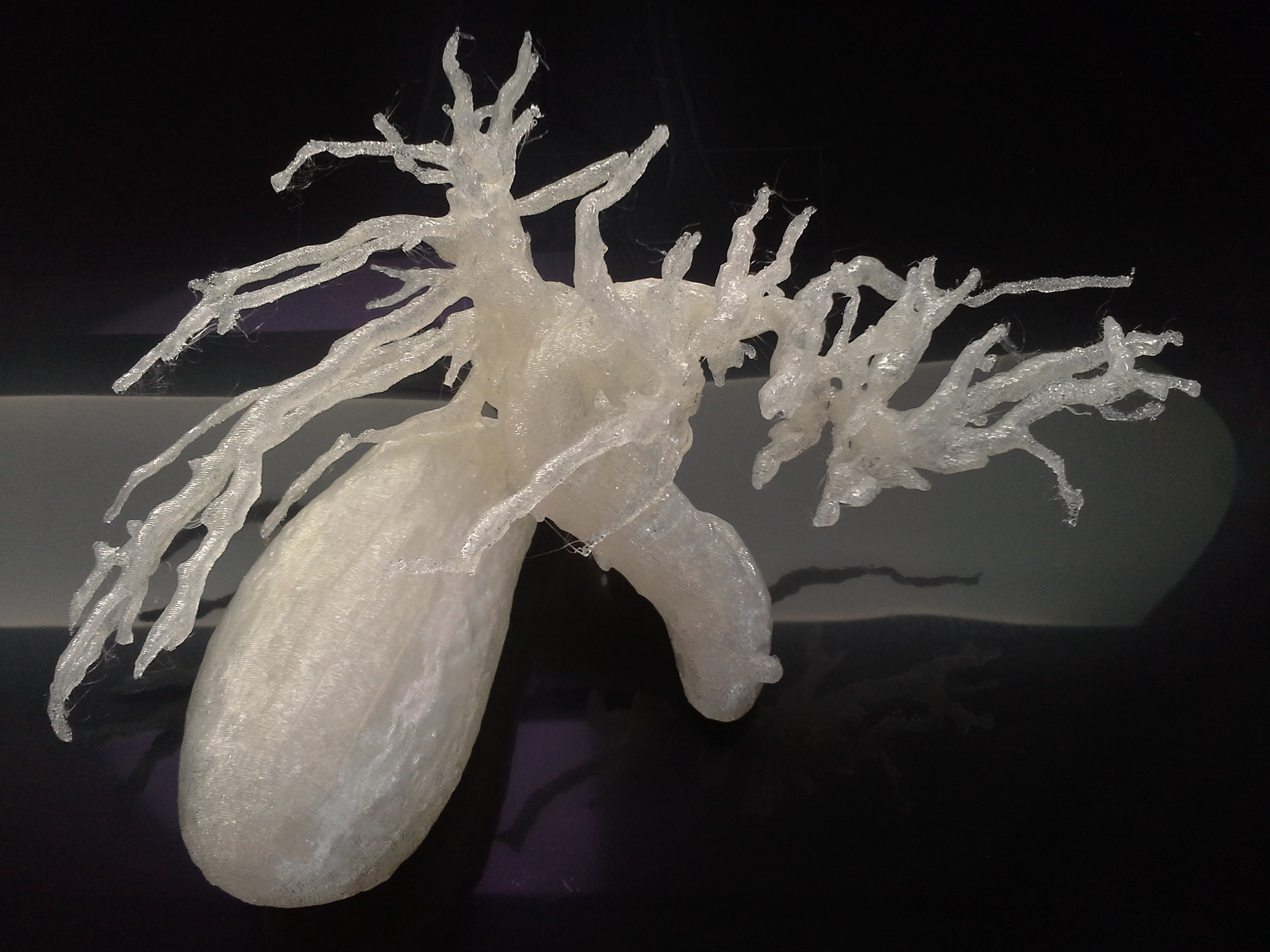
3D printed model of benign biliary stricture from MRCP data.

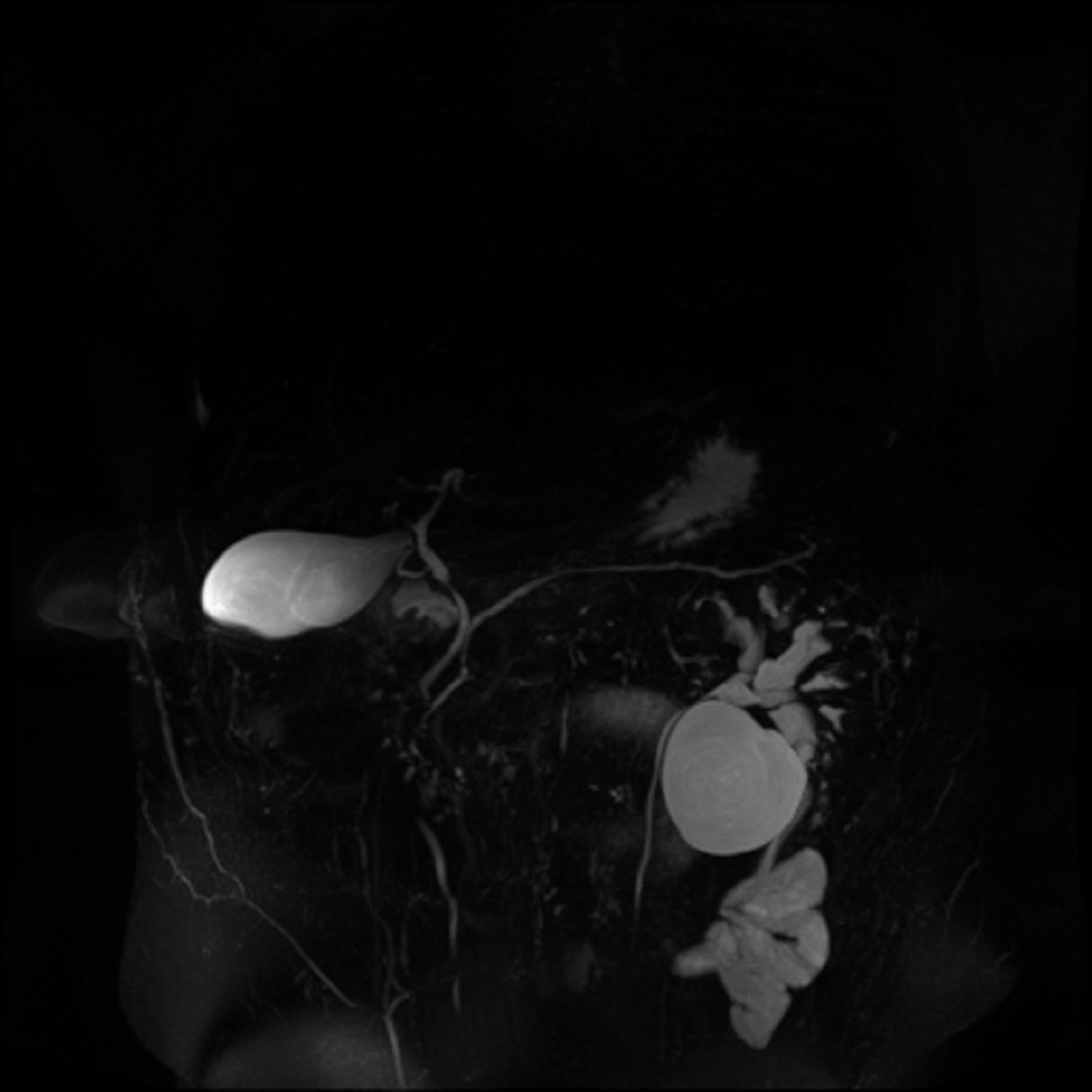
Normal MRCP (with visible renal cyst)

== See also ==
- Magnetic resonance myelography
