= Postcholecystectomy syndrome =

Long-term abdominal symptoms after gall bladder removal

- Specialty: Gastroenterology

Postcholecystectomy syndrome (PCS) describes the presence of abdominal symptoms after a cholecystectomy (gallbladder removal).

Symptoms occur in about 5 to 40 percent of patients who undergo cholecystectomy, and can be transient, persistent or lifelong. The chronic condition is diagnosed in approximately 10% of postcholecystectomy cases.

The pain associated with postcholecystectomy syndrome is usually ascribed to either sphincter of Oddi dysfunction or to post-surgical adhesions. A recent 2008 study shows that postcholecystectomy syndrome can be caused by biliary microlithiasis. Approximately 50% of cases are due to biliary causes such as remaining stone, biliary injury, dysmotility and choledochal cysts. The remaining 50% are due to non-biliary causes. This is because upper abdominal pain and gallstones are both common but are not always related.

Non-biliary causes of PCS may be caused by a functional gastrointestinal disorder, such as functional dyspepsia.

Chronic diarrhea in postcholecystectomy syndrome is a type of bile acid diarrhea (type 3). This can be treated with a bile acid sequestrant like cholestyramine, colestipol or colesevelam, which may be better tolerated.

== Presentation ==
Symptoms of postcholecystectomy syndrome may include:

- Dyspepsia, nausea and vomiting.
- Flatulence, bloating and diarrhea.
- Persistent pain in the upper right abdomen.

== Diagnostics ==
- Ultrasound of the abdominal cavity.
- General and biochemical blood.
- Intravenous cholangiography.
- Esophagogastroduodenoscopy for examination of the stomach, duodenum and the area major duodenal papilla.
- Retrograde cholangiopancreatography.
- Analysis of biliary sludge obtained through endoscopic retrograde cholangiopancreatography (ERCP)
- SeHCAT or other test for bile acid diarrhea

== Treatment ==
Some individuals may benefit from diet modification, such as a reduced fat diet, following cholecystectomy. The liver produces bile and the gallbladder acts as reservoir. From the gallbladder, bile enters the intestine in individual portions. In the absence of a gallbladder, bile enters the intestine constantly, but in small quantities. Thus, it may be insufficient for the digestion of fatty foods. Postcholecystectomy syndrome treatment depends on the identified violations that led to it. Typically, the patient is recommended a dietary restriction table with fatty foods, enzyme preparations, antispasmodics, and sometimes cholagogue.

If the pain is caused by biliary microlithiasis, oral ursodeoxycholic acid can alleviate the condition.

A trial of bile acid sequestrant therapy is recommended for bile acid diarrhea.

Functional dyspepsia is subdivided into Epigastric Distress Syndrome (EPS) and Post-Prandial Distress Syndrome (PDS). Treatment for EPS and PDS can both include proton pump inhibitors and dopamine antagonists. Tricyclic antidepressants have also been proven effective for nausea, vomiting, early satiety, impaired motility and other related symptoms.

When investigation reveals no abnormalities within the abdominal cavity, the attending physician may consider Anterior cutaneous nerve entrapment syndrome (ACNES) as a possible cause. ACNES may present with pseudovisceral symptoms, including nausea, bloating, diarrhea and early satiety.
