= Antidiarrheal =

Medication used to manage and reduce diarrhea

Antidiarrheals are a class of medication used primarily to manage and reduce the frequency of diarrhea. This class of medication predominantly works by slowing digestion, reducing fluid loss, or improving absorption. There are four main classes: opiates, 5-HT_{3} receptor antagonists, adsorbents, and bulk-forming agents. Commonly used medications include loperamide (Imodium), diphenoxylate, bismuth subsalicylate (Pepto-Bismol), Cholestyramine, and Octreotide. Although not considered an antidiarrheal, oral rehydration solutions are also an important aspect of managing diarrhea.

== Medical use ==
=== Acute diarrhea ===
Acute diarrhea is a common condition that typically resolves on its own with oral rehydration therapy. Most cases of acute diarrhea are caused by infections from contaminated food or water and usually go away on their own within a week. The most common causes of acute diarrhea in children are the viral agents norovirus and rotavirus, accounting for about 70% of cases. Travelers’ diarrhea (TD) is one of the most common illnesses affecting people of all ages abroad, with up to 70% of travelers developing symptoms within two weeks. While traditional advice like avoiding uncooked or unpeeled foods was once thought to be effective, poor sanitation and food handling practices—especially in local eateries—remain major risk factors.

Anti-motility medications like loperamide and diphenoxylate can help manage the symptoms of travelers’ diarrhea by reducing the frequency of bowel movements, which can be helpful when needing to travel, but are not curative. Loperamide and diphenoxylate should be avoided in people with bloody diarrhea or a fever, and loperamide is typically not recommended for children under six. Additionally, zinc supplements, particularly in children, can reduce diarrheal duration by up to 25% and reduce stool volume by up to 30%.

=== Dehydration and oral replacement therapy ===
The primary risk from diarrhea is dehydration and electrolyte loss, making fluid and electrolyte replacement the top treatment priority. Drinking fluids orally is typically as effective as IV fluids and more cost-efficient for most patients. Thus, rehydration is essential when managing acute diarrhea, especially in vulnerable groups like young children, older adults, and those with chronic conditions. Oral rehydration solutions are made with clean water, salt, and sugar. These solutions are ideal for severe cases, while milder dehydration can be managed with safe, preferred fluids—though overly sugary drinks should be avoided.

Dehydration is categorized into three levels: severe, some, or none. Severe dehydration includes signs like lethargy, sunken eyes, little to no urine output, and confusion. Some dehydration may present with dry mouth, restlessness, thirst, and slightly sunken eyes. If these signs are absent or insufficient, the person is not considered dehydrated.

=== Chronic diarrhea ===
Chronic diarrhea often persists for greater than a week and may require further work-up from a medical professional. When the underlying cause cannot be directly addressed, long-term symptom management using antidiarrheals is often necessary.

== Adverse effects ==
=== Opiates ===
Loperamide is effective and safe for treating chronic diarrhea. Diphenoxylate and difenoxin work similarly but can affect the brain at high doses, so they're combined with atropine to reduce misuse risks. Stronger opiates like morphine or codeine can treat severe diarrhea, but they're rarely prescribed due to the risk of misuse, and careful monitoring is needed. While generally safe, even when combined with antibiotics, the use of opiates may slightly increase the risk of acquiring antibiotic-resistant bacteria.

=== Bismuth subsalicylate ===
Bismuth subsalicylate is commonly used for diarrhea, but long-term use raises safety concerns and should be monitored. Bismuth can cause common side effects such as nausea, a bitter taste, diarrhea, and darkened stools. Since it is a heavy metal, it may cause encephalopathy in rare cases.

=== Bile acid resins ===
Bile acid binding resins like cholestyramine, colestipol, and colesevelam are effective but can cause constipation and may interfere with the absorption of other medications, so they should be taken at least two hours apart from other drugs.

=== Alpha-2 (α_{2}) adrenergic agonists ===
Clonidine, used for diabetic diarrhea, is often limited by its ability to lower blood pressure.

=== 5-HT_{3} antagonists ===
Alosetron, often used for IBS-related diarrhea, poses a risk of colonic ischemia and severe constipation, which makes it infrequently used.

== Available forms ==
Antidiarrheal Medications
Inhibition of Intestinal Transit
Opioids	Loperamide
Opioids	Eluxadoline
Opioids	Diphenoxylate
Opioids	Difenoxin
Opioids	Codeine
Opioids	Opium
Opioids	Paregoric
Opioids	Morphine
Enkephalinase inhibitor	Racecadotril
5-HT₃ receptor antagonist	Alosetron
α₂-Adrenergic agonist	Clonidine
Somatostatin and analogs	Octreotide
Somatostatin and analogs	Lanreotide
Somatostatin and analogs	Pasireotide
Calcium channel blocker	Nifedipine
Pro-absorptive Agents
Glucose, amino acids	
Oral rehydration solution	
α₂-Adrenergic agonist	Clonidine
Antisecretory Drugs
Somatostatin and analogs	Octreotide
Somatostatin and analogs	Lanreotide
Somatostatin and analogs	Pasireotide
Enterocyte apical membrane chloride channel inhibitors	Crofelemer
Enterocyte apical membrane chloride channel inhibitors	Berberine
Calcium channel blockers	Nifedipine
Calmodulin inhibitors	Chlorpromazine
Calmodulin inhibitors	Trifluoperazine
Calcium-sensing receptor ligands	Calcium
Calcium-sensing receptor ligands	Nicotinic acid
Lithium	
Zinc	
Bismuth	
Nonsteroidal anti-inflammatory drugs	
Corticosteroids	
Teduglutide	
Intraluminal Agents
Adsorbents	Clays
Bile acid-binding resins	Cholestyramine
Bile acid-binding resins	Colestipol
Bile acid-binding resins	Colesevelam
Fiber	

== See also ==
- ATC code A07 Antidiarrheals, intestinal anti-inflammatory/anti-infective agents
