= Bile acid malabsorption =

Bile acid diarrhea / Bile acid malabsorption
- Other names: Bile acid-induced diarrhea, cholerheic or choleretic enteropathy, bile salt diarrhea, bile salt malabsorption
- Specialty: Gastroenterology
- Symptoms: Bowel movement frequency, soft or watery stools, diarrhea, urgency
- Complications: Anxiety, fecal incontinence
- Usual onset: Any age
- Duration: Chronic (longlasting, persistent)
- Types: Primary or secondary or types 1, 2 and 3
- Causes: Surgical resection of ileum, cholecystectomy, idiopathic
- Risk factors: Pelvic radiation disease, small intestinal bacterial overgrowth
- Diagnostic method: Fecal bile acids, SeHCAT, 7α-hydroxy-4-cholesten-3-one
- Differential diagnosis: Irritable bowel syndrome, microscopic colitis
- Medication: Bile acid sequestrants
- Prognosis: Good with treatment
- Frequency: 1 in 100 of population
- Deaths: Non-fatal

Bile acid malabsorption (BAM), known also as bile acid diarrhea, is a cause of several gut-related problems, the main one being chronic diarrhea. It has also been called bile acid-induced diarrhea, cholerheic or choleretic enteropathy, bile salt diarrhea or bile salt malabsorption. It can result from malabsorption secondary to gastrointestinal disease, or be a primary disorder, associated with excessive bile acid production. Treatment with bile acid sequestrants is often effective.

== Signs and symptoms ==
A persistent (chronic) history of diarrhea, with watery or mushy, unformed stools (types 6 and 7 on the Bristol stool scale), sometimes with steatorrhea, increased frequency and urgency of defecation are common manifestations, often with fecal incontinence and other gastrointestinal symptoms such as abdominal swelling, bloating and abdominal pain.

People with this disorder often report impairments of mental health and well-being, including fatigue, dizziness, anxiety about leaving home (primarily due to fear of fecal incontinence), depression, one survey reports. It contributes in delays in diagnosis.

== Pathogenesis ==
=== Enterohepatic circulation of bile salts ===
Bile acids (also called bile salts) are produced in the liver, secreted into the biliary system, stored in the gallbladder and are released after meals stimulated by cholecystokinin. They are important for the digestion and absorption of fats (lipids) in the small intestine. Usually over 95% of the bile acids are absorbed in the terminal ileum and are taken up by the liver and resecreted. This enterohepatic circulation of bile acids takes place four–six times in 24 hours and usually less than 0.5 g of bile acids enter the large intestine per 24 h. When larger amounts of bile acids enter the large intestine, they stimulate water secretion and intestinal motility in the colon, which causes symptoms of chronic diarrhea.

=== Intestinal absorption of bile acids ===
The ileum is very efficient at absorbing the glyco- and taurine-conjugated forms of the bile salts. The apical sodium-dependent bile salt transporter (ASBT, IBAT, gene symbol SLC10A2) is the first step in absorption at the brush-border membrane. The cytoplasmic ileal bile acid binding protein (IBABP, ILBP, gene symbol FABP6) and the basolateral heterodimer of OSTα and OSTβ transfer bile acids through and out of the cell where they eventually enter the portal vein. These bile acid transporters are all highly expressed in the ileum but not in the liver, jejunum or colon. When expression of these specialized transporters is reduced, the intestine is less efficient at bile acid reabsorption (Type 1 bile acid malabsorption). If intestinal motility is affected by gastro-intestinal surgery, or bile acids are deconjugated by small intestinal bacterial overgrowth (SIBO), absorption is less efficient (Type 3 bile acid malabsorption). A very small proportion of the patients with no obvious disease (Type 2 bile acid malabsorption) may have mutations in ASBT, but this mutation is not more common in most patients and does not affect function.

=== Overproduction of bile acids ===
Primary bile acid diarrhea (Type 2 bile acid "malabsorption") may be caused by an overproduction of bile acids. Several groups of workers have failed to show any defect in ileal bile acid absorption in these patients, and they have an enlarged bile acid pool, rather than the reduced pool expected with malabsorption. The synthesis of bile acids in the liver is negatively regulated by the ileal hormone fibroblast growth factor 19 (FGF19), and lower levels of this hormone result in overproduction of bile acids, which are more than the ileum can absorb.

=== Dysmetabolism and gut microbiome ===
A study found that patients suffering from bile acid diarrhea are characterized by a dysmetabolic and prediabetic-like profile, with higher postprandial concentrations of glucose, insulin and glucagon, compared with matched healthy controls. The underlying mechanisms are not fully understood. Furthermore, gut microbiome composition differs from that of people who do not suffer from bile acid diarrhea.

== Diagnosis ==
Several methods have been developed to identify the disorder but there are difficulties with all of them. Diagnosis of bile acid malabsorption is easily and reliably made by the SeHCAT test. This nuclear medicine test involves two scans a week apart and so measures multiple cycles of bile acid excretion and reabsorption. There is limited radiation exposure (0.3 mSv). Retention of SeHCAT at 7 days is normally above 15%; values less than 15%, 10% and 5% predict respectively mild, moderate and severe abnormal retention and an increasing likelihood of response to bile acid sequestrants. This test is not licensed in the US, and is underutilized even where it is available. Older methods such as the ^{14}C-glycocholic breath test are no longer in routine clinical use.

Measurement of 7α-Hydroxy-4-cholesten-3-one (C4), a bile acid precursor, in serum, shows the increased bile acid synthesis found in bile acid malabsorption. This test is an alternative diagnostic means when available. Fasting blood FGF19 values may have value in the recognition of the disease and prediction of response.

The various biomarkers give similar diagnostic yields of around 25% in patients with functional bowel disorders with diarrhea. In countries such as the US, where SeHCAT is not available, fecal bile acids and C4 are available to make the diagnosis.

=== Classification ===
Bile acid malabsorption was first recognized in patients with ileal disease. When other causes were recognized, and an idiopathic, primary form described, a classification into three types was proposed:

- Type 1: Bile acid malabsorption, secondary to ileal resection, or ileal inflammation (e.g. in Crohn's disease)
- Type 2: Idiopathic bile acid malabsorption, Primary bile acid diarrhea
- Type 3: Secondary to various gastrointestinal diseases including cholecystectomy, vagotomy, SIBO, radiation enteropathy, celiac disease, chronic pancreatitis, etc.

== Treatment ==
Bile acid sequestrants are the main agents used to treat bile acid malabsorption. Cholestyramine and colestipol, both in powder form, have been used for many years. Unfortunately, many patients find them difficult to tolerate; although the diarrhea may improve, other symptoms such as abdominal pain and bloating may worsen.

Colesevelam is a tablet which is well tolerated and has been shown in placebo-controlled, randomized clinical trials to be effective.

The farnesoid X receptor agonist obeticholic acid has shown clinical and biochemical benefits in a proof of concept study. Tropifexor is another farnesoid X receptor agonist that has been studied, showing improvements in biochemistry and colonic transit.

Liraglutide, a GLP-1 receptor agonist had unexpected effects in clinical cases with co-existing bile acid diarrhoea which led to a randomised, double-blind, active-comparator, non-inferiority clinical trial. This trial demonstrated superiority in favour of liraglutide compared with colesevelam in reducing stool frequency and improved pathophysiological markers, suggesting it may be a new, safe and more effective treatment compared with current established, cheaper treatment modalities.

== Epidemiology ==
Bile acid malabsorption is common in Crohn's disease but not always recognized. Most people with previous ileal resection and chronic diarrhea will have abnormal SeHCAT tests and can benefit from bile acid sequestrants.

People with primary bile acid diarrhea are frequently misdiagnosed as having irritable bowel syndrome. When SeHCAT testing is performed, the diagnosis of primary bile acid diarrhea is commonly made. In a review of 18 studies of the use of SeHCAT testing in diarrhea-predominant irritable bowel syndrome patients, 32% of 1223 people had a SeHCAT 7-day retention of less than 10%, and 80% of these reported a response to cholestyramine, a bile acid sequestrant.

A study from 2023 investigating the epidemiology of bile acid diarrhea in Denmark, found that people suffering from bile acid diarrhea seemed to have more co-morbidities, lower levels of income and education and more health care contacts compared with matches not suffering from bile acid diarrhea.

Estimates of the population prevalence suggest that 1% of the adult population could have primary bile acid diarrhea (Type 2 bile acid malabsorption).

A nationwide cohort study indicates an association between bile acid diarrhea and gastrointestinal cancers.
