= Sterol 12alpha-hydroxylase =

Sterol 12alpha-hydroxylase may refer to:

- 5beta-cholestane-3alpha,7alpha-diol 12alpha-hydroxylase, an enzyme
- 7alpha-hydroxycholest-4-en-3-one 12alpha-hydroxylase, an enzyme
