= Radiation enteropathy =

Intestinal disease due to radiation exposure

- Other names: Radiation enteritis, pelvic radiation disease
- Specialty: Gastroenterology, surgery, oncology
- Symptoms: Diarrhea, abdominal pain, nausea, vomiting, anorexia and malaise
- Complications: Stricture formation, malabsorption
- Usual onset: Acute: several weeks after radiation Chronic: 8–12 months after radiation

(Redirected from "Pelvic Radiation Disease")

Radiation enteropathy is a syndrome that may develop following abdominal or pelvic radiation therapy for cancer. Many affected people are cancer survivors who had treatment for cervical cancer or prostate cancer. It has also been termed pelvic radiation disease with radiation proctitis being one of its principal features and radiation-induced lumbar plexopathy (RILP) being a rare consequence.

== Signs and symptoms ==
People who have been treated with radiotherapy for pelvic and other abdominal cancers frequently develop gastrointestinal symptoms.

These include:

- rectal bleeding
- diarrhea and steatorrhea
- other defecation disorders including fecal urgency and incontinence.
- nutritional deficiencies and weight loss
- abdominal pain and bloating
- nausea, vomiting and fatigue

Gastrointestinal symptoms are often found together with those in other systems including genitourinary disorders and sexual dysfunction. The burden of symptoms substantially impairs the patients' quality of life.

Nausea, vomiting, fatigue, and diarrhea may happen early during the course of radiotherapy. Radiation enteropathy represents the longer-term, chronic effects that may be found after a latent period most commonly of 6 months to 3 years after the end of treatment. In some cases, it does not become a problem for 20–30 years after successful curative therapy.

=== Associated conditions ===
- Small intestinal bacterial overgrowth
- Exocrine pancreatic insufficiency
- Bile acid diarrhea
- Urinary urgency
- Sexual dysfunction

== Causes ==
A large number of people receive abdominal and or pelvic radiotherapy (RT) as part of their cancer treatment with 60–80% experiencing gastrointestinal symptoms. This is used in standard therapeutic regimens for cervical cancer, prostate cancer, rectal cancer, anal cancer, lymphoma and other abdominal malignancies. Symptoms can be made worse by the effects of surgery, chemotherapy or other drugs given to treat the cancer. Improved methods of radiotherapy have reduced the exposure of non-involved tissues to radiation, concentrating the effects on the cancer. However, as the parts of the intestine such as the ileum and the rectum are immediately adjacent to the cancers, it is impossible to avoid some radiation effects. RT doses > 60 Gy to rectal and anal regions and the pudendal nerve channel correlate with increased late-effect pudendal nerve dysfunction. Previous intestinal surgery, obesity, diabetes, tobacco smoking and vascular disorders also increase the chances of developing enteropathy.

== Pathology ==
=== Acute intestinal injury ===
Early radiation enteropathy is very common during or immediately after the course of radiotherapy. This involves cell death, mucosal inflammation and epithelial barrier dysfunction. This injury is termed mucositis and results in symptoms of nausea, vomiting, fatigue, diarrhea and abdominal pain. It recovers within a few weeks or months.

=== Long-term effects of radiation ===
The delayed effects, found 3 months or more after radiation therapy, produce pathology which includes intestinal epithelial mucosal atrophy, vascular sclerosis, and progressive fibrosis of the intestinal wall, among other changes in intestinal neuroendocrine and immune cells and in the gut microbiota. These changes may produce dysmotility, strictures, malabsorption and bleeding. Problems in the terminal ileum and rectum predominate.

== Diagnosis ==
Multiple disorders are found in patients with radiation enteropathy, so guidance including an algorithmic approach to their investigation has been developed. This includes a holistic assessment with investigations including upper endoscopy, colonoscopy, breath tests and other nutritional and gastrointestinal tests. Full investigation is important as many cancer survivors of radiation therapy develop other causes for their symptoms such as colonic polyps, diverticular disease or hemorrhoids.

== Prevention ==
Prevention of radiation injury to the small bowel is a key aim of techniques such as brachytherapy, field size, multiple field arrangements, conformal radiotherapy techniques and intensity-modulated radiotherapy. Medications including ACE inhibitors, statins and probiotics have also been studied and reviewed.

== Treatment ==
In people presenting with symptoms compatible with radiation enteropathy, the initial step is to identify what is responsible for causing the symptoms. Management is best with a multidisciplinary team including gastroenterologists, nurses, dietitians, surgeons and others. Medical treatments include the use of hyperbaric oxygen which has beneficial effects in radiation proctitis or anal damage. Nutritional therapies include treatments directed at specific malabsorptive disorders such as low fat diets and vitamin B12 or vitamin D supplements, together with bile acid sequestrants for bile acid diarrhea and possibly antibiotics for small intestinal bacterial overgrowth. Probiotics have all been suggested as another therapeutic avenue.

Endoscopic therapies including argon plasma coagulation have been used for bleeding telangiectasia in radiation proctitis and at other intestinal sites, although there is a risk of perforation.

Surgical treatment may be needed for intestinal obstruction, fistulae, or perforation, which can happen in more severe cases. These can be fatal if patients present as an emergency, but with improved radiotherapy techniques are now less common. A systematic review has found there is some promising evidence for non-surgical interventions for late rectal damage, however due to low quality evidence no conclusions could be drawn. Optimal treatment usually produces significant improvements in quality of life.

== Prevalence ==
An increasing number of people are now surviving cancer, with improved treatments producing cure of the malignancy (cancer survivors). There are now over 14 million such people in the US, and this figure is expected to increase to 18 million by 2022. More than half are survivors of abdominal or pelvic cancers, with about 300,000 people receiving abdominal and pelvic radiation each year. It has been estimated there are 1.6 million people in the US with post-radiation intestinal dysfunction, a greater number than those with inflammatory bowel disease such as Crohn's disease or ulcerative colitis.

== Research ==
New agents have been identified in animal studies that may have effects on intestinal radiation injury. The research approach in humans has been reviewed.

== See also ==
- Neurogenic bowel dysfunction
