= OST Family =

Members of the organic solute transporter (OST) family (TC# 2.A.82) (Slc51 genes) have been characterized from a small bottom feeding species of fish called the little skate, Raja erinacea. Members have also been characterized from humans and mice. The OST family is a member of the larger group of secondary carriers, the APC superfamily.

== Substrates ==
Substrates for OST transporters include a variety of organic compounds, most being anionic. Transport of estrone sulfate by the two subunit Ost transporter of Raja erinacea (TC# 2.A.82.1.1) is Na^{+}-independent, ATP-independent, saturable and inhibited by other steroids and anionic drugs. Bile acids such as taurocholate as well as digoxin and prostaglandin E2 are substrates of this system, while estradiol 17β-D-glucuronide and p-aminohippurate are apparently not. Mammalian homologues (e.g., 2.A.82.1.2) similarly exhibit broad substrate specificity, transporting the same compounds, possibly by an anion:anion exchange mechanism.

== Transport reaction ==
The generalized transport reaction catalyzed by OSTα/OSTβ is:

organic anion (out) ⇌ organic anion (in)

== Structure ==
Each transport system consists of two polypeptide chains, designated α and β. For the human protein (TC# 2.A.82.1.2), the α-subunit is of 340 amino acyl residues (aas) with 7 putative transmembrane segments (TMSs) while the β-subunit is of 128 aas with 1 putative TMS near the N-terminus (residues 40-56). Neither OSTα nor OSTβ alone has activity, both serving not only for heterodimerization and trafficking but also for function. The two proteins are highly expressed in many human tissues. The β-subunit is not required to target the α-subunit to the plasma membrane, but coexpression of both genes is required to convert OSTα to the mature glycosylated protein in enterocyte basolateral membranes and possibly for trafficking through the golgi apparatus. OSTαβ proteins are made in a variety of tissues including the small intestine, colon, liver, biliary tract, kidney, and adrenal gland. In polarized epithelial cells, they are localized to the basolateral membrane and function in the export or uptake of bile acids and steroids. Homologues of OSTα are found in many eukaryotes including animals (both vertebrates and invertebrates), plants, fungi and slime molds. Homologues of OSTβ are found only in vertebrate animals.

=== Crystal structures ===
As of early 2016, no crystal structures had been determined. However, bioinformatics utilizing combinations of homology modelling and mutation experiments have been used to explore the heterdimer nature of the system as well as the mechanisms of substrate recognition and transport.

== See also ==
- Organic cation transport proteins
- Organic anion-transporting polypeptide
- Solute carrier family
- Osmoregulation
- Organic anion transporter 1
- Transporter Classification Database
