= Post-vagotomy diarrhea =

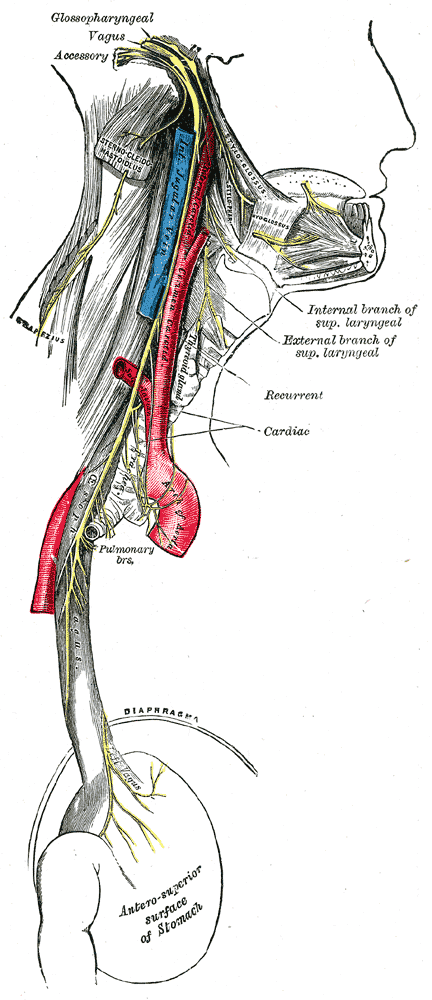
- Course of vagus nerve
- Specialty: Gastroenterology

Post-vagotomy diarrhea is a form of diarrhea which occurs in 10% of people after a truncal vagotomy, which can range from severe to debilitating in approximately 2% to 4% of patients. However, the occurrence of post-vagotomy diarrhea is significantly reduced after proximal selective vagotomy, specifically when celiac and hepatic branches of the vagus are retained.

== Treatment ==
Surgical treatment for refractory post-vagotomy diarrhea is rarely needed and at least one year from the occurrence of symptoms should be allotted to ensure all non-surgical treatments have been appropriately explored. Under severe cases, where surgical intervention does become necessary, a 10 cm reverse jejunal interposition is usually the procedure of choice.
