= 7α-Hydroxy-4-cholesten-3-one =

Names
- IUPAC name 7α-Hydroxycholest-4-en-3-one
- Systematic IUPAC name (1R,3aS,3bS,4R,9aR,9bS,11aR)-5-Hydroxy-9a,11a-dimethyl-1-[(2R)-6-methylheptan-2-yl]-1,2,3,3a,3b,4,5,8,9,9a,9b,10,11,11a-tetradecahydro-7H-cyclopenta[a]phenanthren-7-one
- Other names Cholest-4-en-7α-ol-3-one; 7 α-3ox-C

Identifiers
CAS Number	3862-25-7
3D model (JSmol)	Interactive image
ChemSpider	110306
PubChem CID	123743
CompTox Dashboard (EPA)	DTXSID10191938
- InChI: InChI=1S/C27H44O2/c1-17(2)7-6-8-18(3)21-9-10-22-25-23(12-14-27(21,22)5)26(4)13-11-20(28)15-19(26)16-24(25)29/h15,17-18,21-25,29H,6-14,16H2,1-5H3/t18-,21-,22+,23+,24-,25+,26+,27-/m1/s1 Key: IOIZWEJGGCZDOL-RQDYSCIWSA-N; InChI=1/C27H44O2/c1-17(2)7-6-8-18(3)21-9-10-22-25-23(12-14-27(21,22)5)26(4)13-11-20(28)15-19(26)16-24(25)29/h15,17-18,21-25,29H,6-14,16H2,1-5H3/t18-,21-,22+,23+,24-,25+,26+,27-/m1/s1 Key: IOIZWEJGGCZDOL-RQDYSCIWBX
- SMILES: O=C4\C=C2/[C@]([C@H]1CC[C@]3([C@H]([C@@H]1[C@H](O)C2)CC[C@@H]3[C@H](C)CCCC(C)C)C)(C)CC4

Properties
Chemical formula	C_{27}H_{44}O_{2}
Molar mass	400.647 g·mol^{−1}
- Except where otherwise noted, data are given for materials in their standard state (at 25 °C [77 °F], 100 kPa). Infobox references

7α-Hydroxy-4-cholesten-3-one is an intermediate in the biochemical synthesis of bile acids from cholesterol. Its precursor, 7α-hydroxycholesterol, is produced from cholesterol by hepatic cholesterol 7α-hydroxylase (CYP7A1).

It is metabolized by the enzyme 7α-hydroxycholest-4-en-3-one 12α-hydroxylase to 7α,12α-dihydroxycholest-4-en-3-one and then to cholic acid, the major primary bile acid in humans. Alternatively, it can be converted into 5β-cholestane-3α,7α-diol and then to chenodeoxycholic acid, the other major primary bile acid in humans.

Serum 7α-hydroxy-4-cholesten-3-one concentrations reflect the activity of the bile acid synthetic pathway. Serum 7α-hydroxy-4-cholesten-3-one values vary during the day as bile acid synthetic rates have a diurnal rhythm.

Elevated values are found in patients with bile acid malabsorption and may be useful in the diagnosis of this condition as high values are associated with low SeHCAT retention. The increase in serum 7α-hydroxy-4-cholesten-3-one concentrations reflects the loss of bile acids secondary to bile acid malabsorption or the increased synthesis found in primary bile acid diarrhea associated with impaired negative feedback of CYP7A1 by FGF19.
