= Biliary microlithiasis =

Biliary microlithiasis refers to the creation of small gallstones less than 3 mm in diameter in the biliary duct or gallbladder.

It has been suggested as a cause of postcholecystectomy syndrome, or PCS, the symptoms of which include:

- Upset stomach, nausea, and vomiting.
- Gas, bloating, and diarrhea.
- Persistent pain in the upper right abdomen.

== Diagnostics ==
- Biliary Microlithiasis may be detectable by ultrasound using a Rapid Patient Rotation Ultrasound Protocol
- Analysis of biliary sludge obtained through endoscopic retrograde cholangiopancreatography (ERCP)

== Treatment ==
- Oral ursodeoxycholic acid can be used to dissolve these crystals.

== See also ==
- Biliary sludge
