= Enteroenteric circulation =

In medicine Enteroenteric circulation is the secretion back into the intestines of substances previously taken up from it. It occurs when there is a negative relative concentration of substance in the intestines, making it passively diffuse from the mesenteric circulation into the intestinal lumen and is trapped.

Examples of toxins that exhibit enteroenteric circulation include theophylline, phenobarbital, and phenytoin. Administration of activated charcoal inhibits the enteroenteric circulation of such substances, and is therefore useful in overdose or intoxication.

== See also ==
- Enterohepatic circulation
