= Biliary sludge =

- Other names: Gallbladder sludge, Microcrystalline disease, Biliary sediment, Thick bile, Biliary sand, biliary gravel
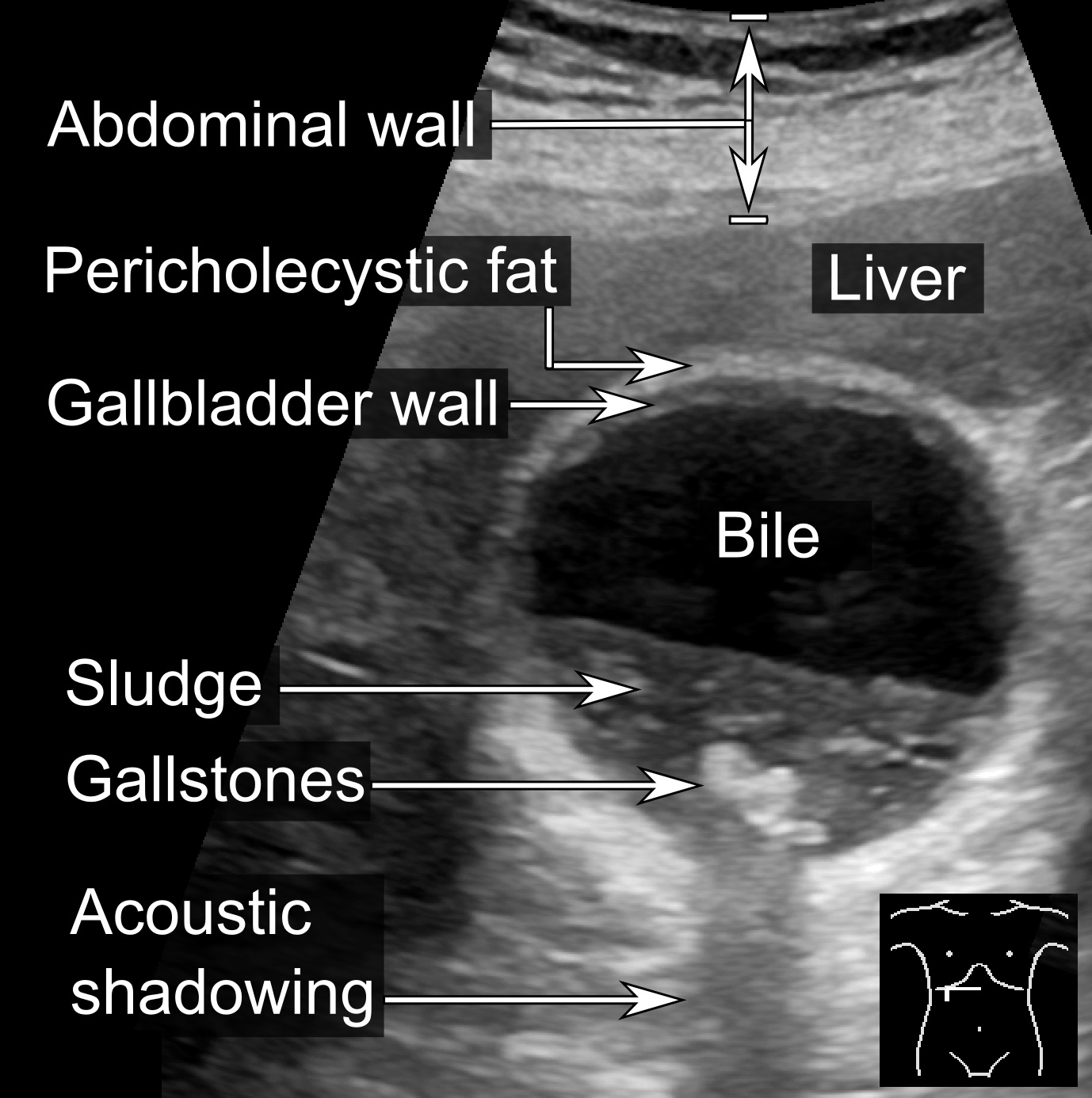
- Abdominal ultrasonography showing biliary sludge and gallstones
- Specialty: Gastroenterology

Biliary sludge refers to a viscous mixture of small particles derived from bile. These sediments consist of cholesterol crystals, calcium salts, calcium bilirubinate, mucin, and other materials.

== Signs and symptoms ==
=== Complications ===
Biliary sludge may cause complications such as biliary colic, acute cholecystitis, acute cholangitis, and acute pancreatitis.

== Cause ==
Biliary sludge has been associated with pregnancy, rapid weight loss, total parenteral nutrition, drugs such as ceftriaxone and octreotide, solid organ transplantation, and gastric surgery. In many of these conditions, it is thought that the impairment in the contractility of the gallbladder leads to the formation of the sludge.

== Pathophysiology ==
The pathophysiology of biliary sludge formation is likely related to gallbladder dysmotility. It is presumed that because the gallbladder is unable to effectively empty, the biliary sludge can start to accumulate.

== Diagnosis ==
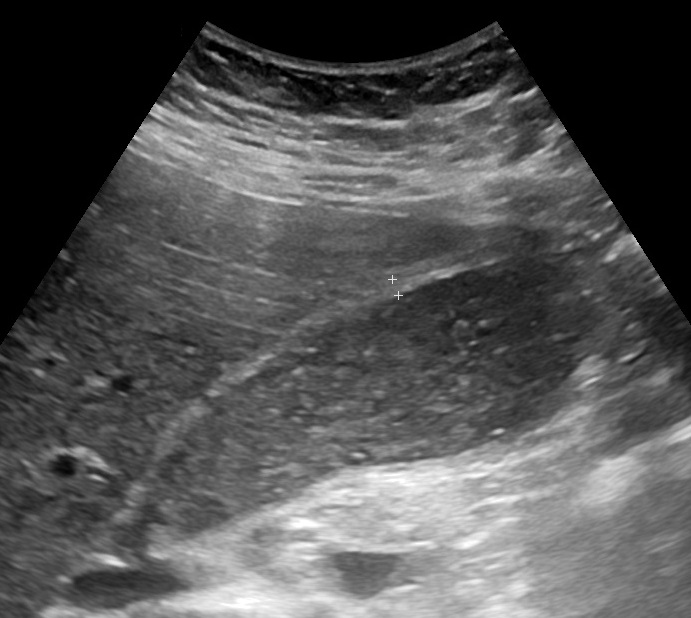
Gallbladder hepatization, which is biliary sludge filling the entire gallbladder, giving it an echogenicity similar to the liver (seen at left). The patient had a stone in the cystic duct.

Biliary sludge is typically diagnosed by CT scan or transabdominal ultrasonography. Endoscopic ultrasonography is another more sensitive option. However, the gold standard is considered to be direct microscopy of aspirated gallbladder bile. This method is much more sensitive, although it is less practical.

== Treatment ==
For patients without symptoms, no treatment is recommended. If patients become symptomatic and/or develop complications, cholecystectomy is indicated. For those who are poor surgical candidates, endoscopic sphincterotomy may be performed to reduce the risk of developing pancreatitis.

== Prognosis ==
The clinical course of biliary sludge can do one of three things: (1) it can resolve completely, (2) wax and wane, or (3) progress to gallstones. If the biliary sludge has a cause (e.g. pregnancy), it oftentimes is resolved when the underlying cause is removed.

== Epidemiology ==
The prevalence of biliary sludge is low in the general population. It has been reported that the prevalence ranges from 0-0.20% in men and 0.18-0.27% in women. However, in patients with certain conditions, the prevalence may be higher.

== See also ==
- Biliary microlithiasis
