= OSTbeta =

Protein-coding gene in the species Homo sapiens

SLC51B

Identifiers
- Aliases: SLC51B, OSTB, OSTBETA, OSTbeta, solute carrier family 51 beta subunit, solute carrier family 51 subunit beta, PBAM2
- External IDs: OMIM: 612085; MGI: 3582052; HomoloGene: 18721; GeneCards: SLC51B; OMA:SLC51B - orthologs

Gene location (Human)
Chr.	Chromosome 15 (human)
Band	15q22.31	Start	65,045,387 bp
Band	15q22.31	End	65,053,397 bp

Gene location (Mouse)
Chr.	Chromosome 9 (mouse)
Band	9|9 C	Start	65,319,996 bp
Band	9|9 C	End	65,330,237 bp
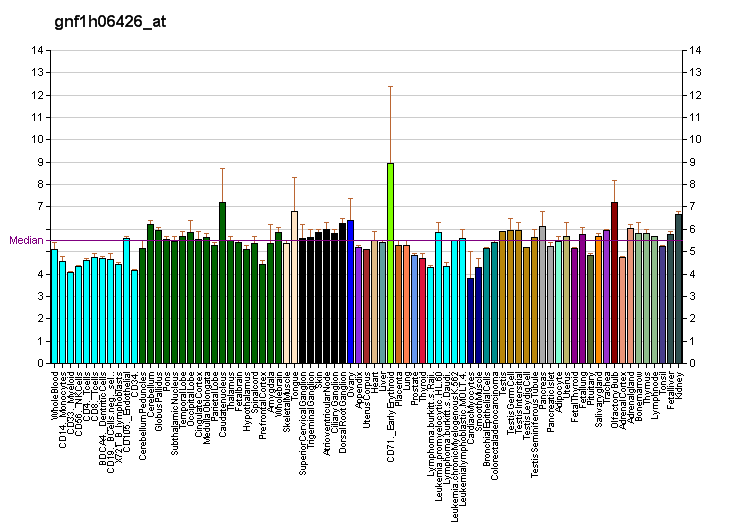
RNA expression pattern
Bgee	Human / Mouse (ortholog); Top expressed in: mucosa of ileum; mucosa of transverse colon; duodenum; rectum; jejunal mucosa; testicle; mucosa of sigmoid colon; popliteal artery; tibial arteries; right coronary artery / Top expressed in: jejunum; ileum; epithelium of small intestine; right kidney; proximal tubule; duodenum; human kidney; Paneth cell; large intestine; colon; More reference expression data
BioGPS	More reference expression data
Gene ontology
Molecular function	transporter activity; protein heterodimerization activity; bile acid transmembrane transporter activity; transmembrane transporter activity
Cellular component	integral component of membrane; plasma membrane; membrane; basolateral plasma membrane; protein-containing complex
Biological process	positive regulation of protein glycosylation; regulation of protein stability; positive regulation of protein exit from endoplasmic reticulum; bile acid and bile salt transport; positive regulation of protein targeting to membrane; bile acid secretion; transmembrane transport; organic substance transport
Sources:Amigo / QuickGO
Orthologs
Species	Human	Mouse
Entrez	123264	330962
Ensembl	ENSG00000186198	ENSMUSG00000053862
UniProt	Q86UW2	Q80WK2
RefSeq (mRNA)	NM_178859	NM_178933
RefSeq (protein)	NP_849190	NP_849264
Location (UCSC)	Chr 15: 65.05 – 65.05 Mb	Chr 9: 65.32 – 65.33 Mb
PubMed search
- Wikidata
View/Edit Human	View/Edit Mouse

Organic solute transporter beta, also known as OST-beta, is a protein which in humans is encoded by the OSTB gene.

== Function ==
OST-beta together with OST-alpha is able to transport estrone sulfate, taurocholate, digoxin, and prostaglandin E2 across cell membranes. The Ost-alpha / Ost-beta heterodimer, but not the individual subunits, stimulates sodium-independent bile acid uptake. The heterodimer furthermore is essential for intestinal bile acid transport.

OST-alpha and OST-beta have high expression in the testis, colon, liver, small intestine, kidney, ovary, and adrenal gland.

== See also ==
- OSTalpha
- OST Family
- Transporter Classification Database
