= Colestipol =

Chemical compound

Clinical data
- Trade names: Colestid, Cholestabyl
- AHFS/Drugs.com: Monograph
- MedlinePlus: a682157
- Routes of administration: Oral (suspension or tablets)
- ATC code: C10AC02 (WHO)

Legal status
- Legal status: US: ℞-only

Pharmacokinetic data
- Bioavailability: None
- Excretion: Faeces, in complex with bile acids

Identifiers
- IUPAC name: Copolymer of bis(2-aminoethyl)amine and 2-(chloromethyl)oxirane
- CAS Number: 26658-42-4 37296-80-3 (HCl)
- PubChem CID: 62816
- DrugBank: DB00375
- ChemSpider: none
- UNII: K50N755924
- KEGG: C06925
- ChEMBL: ChEMBL1201678
- CompTox Dashboard (EPA): DTXSID00965206 DTXSID901009549, DTXSID00965206
- ECHA InfoCard: 100.123.044

Chemical and physical data
- Formula: (C_{4}H_{10}N_{3})_{m}(C_{3}H_{6}O)_{n}

Colestipol (trade names Colestid, Cholestabyl) is a bile acid sequestrant used to lower blood cholesterol, specifically low-density lipoprotein (LDL). It is also used to reduce stool volume and frequency, and in the treatment of chronic diarrhea.

Like cholestyramine, colestipol works in the gut by trapping bile acids and preventing them from being reabsorbed. This leads to decreased enterohepatic recirculation of bile acids, increased synthesis of new bile acids by the liver from cholesterol, decreased liver cholesterol, increased LDL receptor expression, and decreasing LDL in blood.

== Side effects ==
The following notable side effects may occur:

- gastrointestinal tract disturbances, especially (mild, occasionally severe) constipation
- sometimes increase in VLDL and triglyceride synthesis

== Interactions ==
Colestipol can bind to a number of drugs and nutrients in the gut and inhibit or delay their absorption. Such substances include:

- thiazide diuretics, furosemide
- gemfibrozil
- benzylpenicillin, tetracycline
- digoxin
- lipid-soluble vitamins (A, D, E, K)

== Contraindications ==
Colestipol is contraindicated in hypertriglyceridemia (high level of triglycerides in the blood).

== Chemistry ==
Colestipol is a copolymer of diethylenetriamine (DETA) —or tetraethylenepentamine according to some sources— and epichlorohydrin. The structure drawing (top right) shows the DETA moieties in blue and the epichlorohydrin moieties in red.

Alternative chemical structure, with tetraethylenepentamine instead of diethylenetriamine; formula (C_{8}H_{18}N_{5})_{m}(C_{3}H_{6}O)_{n}

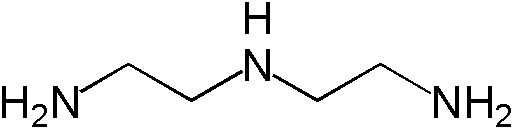
The constituent DETA

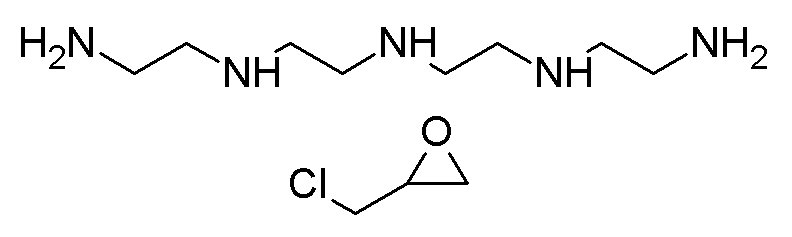
The constituents tetraethylenepentamine (top) and epichlorohydrin (bottom)
