= 7alpha-hydroxycholest-4-en-3-one 12alpha-hydroxylase =

Class of enzymes

Identifiers
- EC no.: 1.14.14.139

Databases
- IntEnz: IntEnz view
- BRENDA: BRENDA entry
- ExPASy: NiceZyme view
- KEGG: KEGG entry
- MetaCyc: metabolic pathway
- PRIAM: profile
- PDB structures: RCSB PDB PDBe PDBsum
Search
- PMC: articles
- PubMed: articles
- NCBI: proteins

7alpha-hydroxycholest-4-en-3-one 12alpha-hydroxylase (EC 1.14.14.139, previously EC 1.14.13.95) is an enzyme that catalyzes the chemical reaction:

7alpha-hydroxycholest-4-en-3-one + NADPH + H^{+} + O_{2} $\rightleftharpoons$ 7alpha,12alpha-dihydroxycholest-4-en-3-one + NADP^{+} + H_{2}O

The 4 substrates of this enzyme are 7alpha-hydroxycholest-4-en-3-one (7 alpha-hydroxy-4-cholesten-3-one, NADPH, H^{+}, and O_{2}. Its products are 7alpha,12alpha-dihydroxycholest-4-en-3-one, NADP^{+}, and H_{2}O.

Since 2015, the enzyme has been classified with EC 1.14.14.139 with the systematic name of 5β-cholestan-3α,7α-diol 12α-hydroxylase. Other names that have been used include 7alpha-hydroxycholest-4-en-3-one,NADPH:oxygen oxidoreductase (12alpha-hydroxylating), 7alpha-hydroxy-4-cholesten-3-one 12alpha-monooxygenase, CYP12, sterol 12alpha-hydroxylase (ambiguous), and HCO 12alpha-hydroxylase.

This enzyme belongs to the family of oxidoreductases, specifically those acting on paired donors, with O_{2} as oxidant and incorporation or reduction of oxygen. The oxygen incorporated need not be derived from O_{2}, with NADH or NADPH as one donor, and incorporation of one atom of oxygen into the other donor. It was purified and characterized from rabbit liver microsomes in 1992 and was cloned and sequenced in 1996. Its structure was 39% similar to human prostacyclin synthase (CYP8) and 31% similar to cholesterol 7 alpha-hydroxylase (CYP7).

This enzymatic activity is now known to be performed by the product of the CYP8B1 gene. This step leads to the formation of the bile acid cholic acid. Cholic acid is a 3,7,12 tri-hydroxy bile acid and is one of the major bile acids in humans and many other animals. Activity of this enzyme determines the balance between cholic and chenodeoxycholic acids in humans.
