= OSTalpha =

Protein-coding gene in the species Homo sapiens

SLC51A

Identifiers
- Aliases: SLC51A, OSTA, OSTalpha, solute carrier family 51 alpha subunit, solute carrier family 51 subunit alpha, PFIC6
- External IDs: OMIM: 612084; MGI: 2146634; GeneCards: SLC51A

Gene location (Human)
Chr.	Chromosome 3 (human)
Band	3q29	Start	196,211,487 bp
Band	3q29	End	196,243,178 bp

Gene location (Mouse)
Chr.	Chromosome 16 (mouse)
Band	16|16 B3	Start	32,293,322 bp
Band	16|16 B3	End	32,306,697 bp
RNA expression pattern
Bgee	Human / Mouse (ortholog); Top expressed in: mucosa of ileum; mucosa of transverse colon; right lobe of liver; nasal epithelium; jejunal mucosa; duodenum; olfactory zone of nasal mucosa; right testis; sperm; left testis / Top expressed in: ileum; intestinal villus; jejunum; right kidney; duodenum; Ileal epithelium; human kidney; migratory enteric neural crest cell; proximal tubule; crypt of lieberkuhn of small intestine; More reference expression data
BioGPS	n/a
Gene ontology
Molecular function	protein homodimerization activity; protein heterodimerization activity; bile acid transmembrane transporter activity; transmembrane transporter activity
Cellular component	integral component of membrane; plasma membrane; endoplasmic reticulum membrane; endoplasmic reticulum; membrane; basolateral plasma membrane; protein-containing complex
Biological process	bile acid and bile salt transport; bile acid secretion; transmembrane transport; organic substance transport
Sources:Amigo / QuickGO
Orthologs
Databases	NCBI: entry; OMA: entry
Species	Human	Mouse
Entrez	200931	106407
Ensembl	ENSG00000163959	ENSMUSG00000035699
UniProt	Q86UW1	Q8R000
RefSeq (mRNA)	NM_152672	NM_145932
RefSeq (protein)	NP_689885	NP_666044
Location (UCSC)	Chr 3: 196.21 – 196.24 Mb	Chr 16: 32.29 – 32.31 Mb
PubMed search
- Wikidata
View/Edit Human	View/Edit Mouse

Organic solute transporter alpha, also known as OST-alpha, is a protein which in humans is encoded by the SLC51A gene.

== Function ==
OST-alpha together with OST-beta is able to transport estrone sulfate, taurocholate, digoxin, and prostaglandin E2 across cell membranes. The Ost-alpha / Ost-beta heterodimer, but not the individual subunits, stimulates sodium-independent bile acid uptake. The heterodimer furthermore is essential for intestinal bile acid transport.

OST-alpha and OST-alpha have high expression in the testis, colon, liver, small intestine, kidney, ovary, and adrenal gland.

== See also ==
- OSTbeta
- OST Family
- Transporter Classification Database
