= SeHCAT =

Names
- IUPAC name (^{75}Se)-2-[[[[(3α,5α,7α,12α,20S)-3,7,12-trihydroxy-20-methylpregnan-21-yl]seleno]acetyl]amino]ethanesulfonic acid,
- Other names 23-Seleno-25-homo-tauro-cholic acid; Selenium homocholic acid taurine; Tauroselcholic acid

Identifiers
CAS Number	75018-71-2
3D model (JSmol)	Interactive image
ChemSpider	2342733
PubChem CID	3086012
UNII	H6630PU5ZJ
CompTox Dashboard (EPA)	DTXSID601108465
- InChI: InChI=1S/C26H45NO7SSe/c1-15(13-36-14-23(31)27-8-9-35(32,33)34)18-4-5-19-24-20(12-22(30)26(18,19)3)25(2)7-6-17(28)10-16(25)11-21(24)29/h15-22,24,28-30H,4-14H2,1-3H3,(H,27,31)(H,32,33,34)/t15-,16+,17-,18-,19+,20+,21-,22+,24+,25+,26-/m1/s1 Key: JCMLWGQJPSGGEI-HZAMXZRMSA-N
- SMILES: C[C@H](C[75Se]CC(NCCS(O)(=O)=O)=O)[C@@]1([H])CC[C@@]2([H])[C@]3([H])[C@H](O)C[C@]4([H])C[C@H](O)CC[C@]4(C)[C@@]3([H])C[C@H](O)[C@@]21C

Properties
Chemical formula	C_{26}H_{45}NO_{7}SSe
Molar mass	594.68 g·mol^{−1}

Pharmacology
ATC code	V09DX01 (WHO)
- Except where otherwise noted, data are given for materials in their standard state (at 25 °C [77 °F], 100 kPa). verify (what is ?) Infobox references

SeHCAT was used as the brand name for tauroselcholic acid (⁷⁵Se), also known as 23-seleno-25-homotaurocholic acid or selenium homocholic acid taurine. This drug is used in a clinical test (the SeHCAT test) to diagnose bile acid malabsorption.

== Development ==
This taurine-conjugated bile acid analog was synthesized for use as a radiopharmaceutical to investigate in vivo the enterohepatic circulation of bile salts. By incorporating the gamma-emitter ^{75}Se into the molecule, the retention in the body or the loss of this compound into the feces could be studied easily using a standard gamma camera, available in most clinical nuclear medicine departments.

SeHCAT has been shown to be absorbed from the gut and excreted into the bile at the same rate as cholic acid, one of the major natural bile acids in humans. It undergoes secretion into the biliary tree, gallbladder and intestine in response to food, and is reabsorbed efficiently in the ileum, with kinetics similar to natural bile acids. It was soon shown to be the most convenient and accurate method available to assess and measure bile acid turnover in the intestine. SeHCAT testing was commercially developed by Amersham International Ltd (Amersham plc is now part of GE Healthcare Medical Diagnostics division) for clinical use to investigate malabsorption in patients with diarrhea. This test has replaced ^{14}C-labeled glycocholic acid (or taurocholic acid) breath tests and fecal bile acid measurements, which now have no place in the routine clinical investigation of malabsorption.

== Procedure ==
A capsule containing radiolabelled ^{75}SeHCAT (with 370 kBq of Selenium-75 and less than 0.1 mg SeHCAT) is taken orally with water, to ensure passage of the capsule into the gastrointestinal tract. The physical half life of ^{75}Se is approximately 118 days; activity is adjusted to a standard reference date.

Patients may be given instructions to fast prior to capsule administration; there is significant variation in clinical practice in this regard. The effective dose of radiation for an adult given 370 kBq of SeHCAT is 0.26 mSv. (For comparison, the radiation exposure from an abdominal CT scan is quoted at 5.3 mSv and annual background exposure in the UK 1-3 mSv.) Measurements were originally performed with a whole-body counter but are usually performed now with an uncollimated gamma camera. The patient is scanned supine or prone with anterior and posterior acquisition from head to thigh 1 to 3 hours after taking the capsule. Scanning is repeated after 7 days. Background values are subtracted and care must be taken to avoid external sources of radiation in a nuclear medicine department.

From these measurements, the percent retention of SeHCAT at 7 days is calculated. A 7-day SeHCAT retention value greater than 15% is considered to be normal, with values less than 15% signifying excessive bile acid loss, as found in bile acid malabsorption.

With more frequent measurements, it is possible to calculate SeHCAT retention whole-body half-life; this is not routinely measured in a clinical setting. A half-life of greater than 2.8 days has been quoted as normal.

== Clinical use ==
The SeHCAT test is used to investigate patients with suspected bile acid malabsorption, who usually experience chronic diarrhea, often passing watery feces 5 to 10 times each day. When ileum has been removed following surgery, or is inflamed in Crohn's disease, the 7-day SeHCAT retention usually is abnormal, and most of these patients will benefit from treatment with bile acid sequestrants. The enterohepatic circulation of bile acids is reduced in these patients with ileal abnormalities and, as the normal bile acid retention exceeds 95%, only a small degree of change is needed. Bile acid malabsorption can also be secondary to cholecystectomy, vagotomy and other disorders affecting intestinal motility or digestion such as radiation enteritis, celiac disease, and small intestinal bacterial overgrowth.

A similar picture of chronic diarrhea, an abnormal SeHCAT retention and a response to bile acid sequestrants, in the absence of other disorders of the intestine, is characteristic of idiopathic bile acid malabsorption – also called primary bile acid diarrhea. These patients are frequently misdiagnosed as having irritable bowel syndrome (IBS), as clinicians fail to recognize the condition, do not think of performing a SeHCAT test, or do not have it available.

There have been at least 18 studies of the use of SeHCAT testing in diarrhea-predominant IBS patients. When these data were combined, 32% of 1223 patients had a SeHCAT 7-day retention of less than 10%, and 80% of these reported a response to cholestyramine, a bile acid sequestrant.
