= 5beta-cholestane-3alpha,7alpha-diol 12alpha-hydroxylase =

Class of enzymes

Identifiers
- EC no.: 1.14.13.96

Databases
- IntEnz: IntEnz view
- BRENDA: BRENDA entry
- ExPASy: NiceZyme view
- KEGG: KEGG entry
- MetaCyc: metabolic pathway
- PRIAM: profile
- PDB structures: RCSB PDB PDBe PDBsum
Search
- PMC: articles
- PubMed: articles
- NCBI: proteins

In enzymology, a 5beta-cholestane-3alpha,7alpha-diol 12alpha-hydroxylase (EC 1.14.13.96) is an enzyme that catalyzes the chemical reaction

5beta-cholestane-3alpha,7alpha-diol + NADPH + H^{+} + O_{2} $\rightleftharpoons$ 5beta-cholestane-3alpha,7alpha,12alpha-triol + NADP^{+} + H_{2}O

The 4 substrates of this enzyme are 5beta-cholestane-3alpha,7alpha-diol, NADPH, H^{+}, and O_{2}, whereas its 3 products are 5beta-cholestane-3alpha,7alpha,12alpha-triol, NADP^{+}, and H_{2}O.

== Nomenclature ==
This enzyme belongs to the family of oxidoreductases, specifically those acting on paired donors, with O2 as oxidant and incorporation or reduction of oxygen. The oxygen incorporated need not be derived from O2 with NADH or NADPH as one donor, and incorporation of one atom o oxygen into the other donor. The systematic name of this enzyme class is 5beta-cholestane-3alpha,7alpha-diol,NADPH:oxygen oxidoreductase (12alpha-hydroxylating). Other names in common use include 5beta-cholestane-3alpha,7alpha-diol 12alpha-monooxygenase, sterol 12alpha-hydroxylase (ambiguous), CYP8B1, and cytochrome P450 8B1.
