= Bile acid sequestrant =

Class of drug

The bile acid sequestrants are a group of resins used to bind certain components of bile in the gastrointestinal tract. They disrupt the enterohepatic circulation of bile acids by combining with bile constituents and preventing their reabsorption from the gut. In general, they are classified as hypolipidemic agents, although they may be used for purposes other than lowering cholesterol. They are used in the treatment of chronic diarrhea due to bile acid malabsorption.

== Mechanism ==
Bile acid sequestrants are polymeric compounds that serve as ion-exchange resins. Bile acid sequestrants exchange anions such as chloride ions for bile acids. By doing so, they bind bile acids and sequester them from the enterohepatic circulation. The liver then produces more bile acids to replace those that have been lost. Because the body uses cholesterol to make bile acids, this reduces the level of LDL cholesterol circulating in the blood.

Bile acid sequestrants are large polymeric structures, and they are not significantly absorbed from the gut into the bloodstream. Thus, bile acid sequestrants, along with any bile acids bound to the drug, are excreted via the feces after passage through the gastrointestinal tract.

== Medical uses ==
=== Hyperlipidemia ===
As bile acids are biosynthesized from cholesterol, disruption of bile acid reabsorption will decrease cholesterol levels, in particular, low-density lipoprotein (commonly known as "bad cholesterol") in blood. Consequently, these drugs have been used for the treatment of hypercholesterolemia and dyslipidemia.

Use of these agents as hypolipidemic agents has decreased markedly since the introduction of the statins, which are more efficacious than bile acid sequestrants at lowering LDL. They are occasionally used as an adjunct to the statins as an alternative to the fibrates (another major group of cholesterol-lowering drugs), which are thought to increase the risk of rhabdomyolysis when used with statins. The bile-acid-binding resins can raise triglycerides modestly (about 5%) and cannot be used if the triglycerides are elevated.

=== Bile acid malabsorption ===
Chronic diarrhea may be caused by excess bile salts entering the colon rather than being absorbed at the end of the small intestine (the ileum). This condition of bile acid malabsorption occurs after surgery to the ileum, in Crohn's disease, with a number of other gastrointestinal causes, or is commonly a primary, idiopathic condition. The SeHCAT test can be used for diagnosis. Bile salt diarrhea can also be a side-effect of gallbladder removal.

Bile acid sequestrants are the principal therapy for bile acid-induced diarrhea. Cholestyramine, colestipol and colesevelam have all been used. Doses may not need to be as high as those previously used for hyperlipidemia. Many patients find them hard to tolerate, as although the diarrhea may improve, bloating and abdominal pain can worsen.

=== Use in other conditions ===
In chronic liver diseases such as cirrhosis, bile acids may deposit in the skin, causing pruritus (itching). Hence, bile acid sequestrants may be used for the prevention of pruritus in patients with chronic liver disease.

Bile acid sequestrants may also be used to treat hyperthyroidism as an adjunct therapy. By inhibiting the enterohepatic circulation, more L-thyroxine will be lost through defecation, thus lowering body thyroxine levels.

Cholestyramine has been used in the treatment of Clostridioides difficile infections, in order to absorb toxins A and B.

== Side effects ==
As bile acid sequestrants are designed to stay in the gut; in general, they do not have systemic side effects. However, they may cause problems in the gastrointestinal tract, such as constipation, diarrhea, bloating, and flatulence. Some patients complain of the bad taste.

Because bile acid sequestrants are not well-absorbed from the gut, they are generally regarded as safe in pregnant women. However, by interfering with vitamin absorption (see below), they could cause vitamin deficiencies that may affect the fetus. So, vitamin supplementation may be considered, with appropriate intervals between dosing of the vitamins and bile acid sequestrants.

== Drug interactions ==
In addition to bile acids, bile acid sequestrants may also bind drugs in the GI tract, preventing their absorption into the bloodstream. For this reason, it is generally advised that bile acid sequestrants be spaced several hours apart from other drugs.

=== Vitamins ===
They can also bind fat-soluble vitamins, such as vitamin A, vitamin D, vitamin E, and vitamin K. This effect could result in a vitamin deficiency, and so checking blood levels and possible supplementation has been suggested.

== Examples ==
Three drugs are members of this class; all are synthetic polymeric resins:

- Cholestyramine (generic and various proprietary names)
- Colestipol (Colestid, Colestipid)
- Colesevelam (Cholestagel in Europe, Welchol in the US, Lodalis in Canada)
