= Diarrhea =

Loose or liquid bowel movements

- Other names: Diarrhoea, diarrhœa, the runs, the trots, the shits, the squirts, the squits
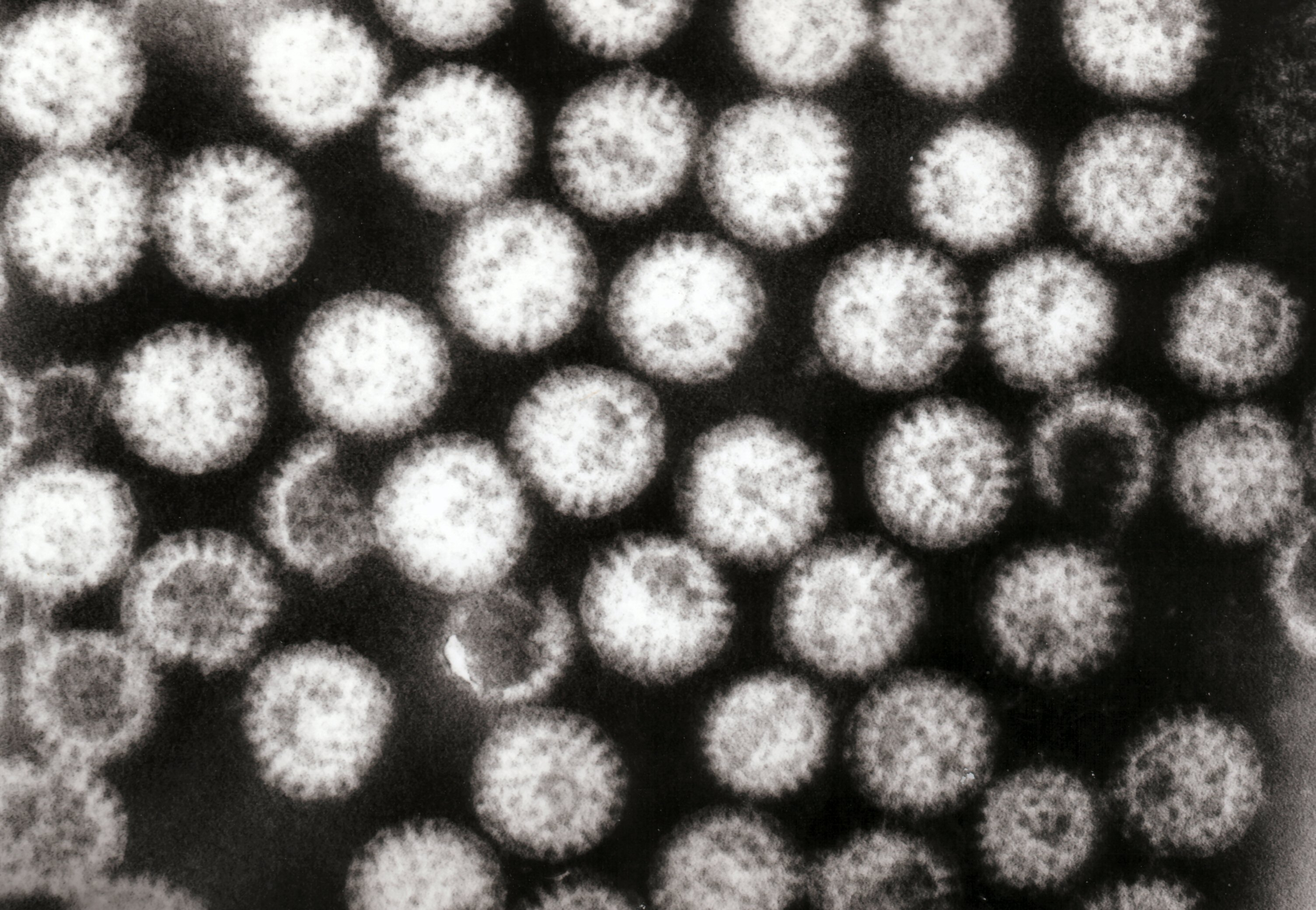
- An electron micrograph of rotavirus, the cause of nearly 40% of hospitalizations from diarrhea in children under five
- Pronunciation: /ˌdaɪəˈriːə/
- Specialty: Infectious disease, gastroenterology
- Symptoms: Loose frequent bowel movements, dehydration
- Causes: Usually infection (viral, bacterial, parasitic)
- Risk factors: Contaminated food or water
- Prevention: Handwashing, rotavirus vaccination, hand sanitizer, breastfeeding
- Treatment: Oral rehydration solution, zinc supplementation
- Frequency: ≈2.4 billion (2015)
- Deaths: 1.53 million (2019)

What is diarrhea? How is it caused, treated and prevented? (see also script)

Diarrhea (American English), also spelled diarrhoea (British English), (Note: or diarrhœa.) is the condition of having at least three loose, liquid, or watery bowel movements in a day. It often lasts for a few days and can result in dehydration due to fluid loss. Signs of dehydration often begin with loss of the normal stretchiness of the skin and irritable behaviour. This can progress to decreased urination, loss of skin color, a fast heart rate, and a decrease in responsiveness as it becomes more severe. Loose but non-watery stools in babies who are exclusively breastfed, however, are normal.

The most common cause is an infection of the intestines due to a virus, bacterium, or parasite—a condition also known as gastroenteritis. These infections are often acquired from food or water that has been contaminated by feces, or directly from another person who is infected. The three types of diarrhea are: short duration watery diarrhea, short duration bloody diarrhea, and persistent diarrhea (lasting more than two weeks, which can be either watery or bloody). The short duration watery diarrhea may be due to cholera, although this is rare in the developed world. If blood is present, it is also known as dysentery. A number of non-infectious causes can result in diarrhea. These include lactose intolerance, side effect of drug withdrawal, irritable bowel syndrome, non-celiac gluten sensitivity, celiac disease, inflammatory bowel disease such as ulcerative colitis, hyperthyroidism, bile acid diarrhea, and a number of medications. In most cases, stool cultures to confirm the exact cause are not required.

Diarrhea can be prevented by improved sanitation, clean drinking water, and hand washing with soap. Breastfeeding for at least six months and vaccination against rotavirus is also recommended. Oral rehydration solution (ORS)—clean water with modest amounts of salts and sugar—is the treatment of choice. Zinc tablets are also recommended. These treatments have been estimated to have saved 50 million children in the past 25 years. When people have diarrhea it is recommended that they continue to eat healthy food, and babies continue to be breastfed. If commercial ORS is not available, homemade solutions may be used. In those with severe dehydration, intravenous fluids may be required. Most cases, however, can be managed well with fluids by mouth. Antibiotics, while rarely used, may be recommended in a few cases such as those who have bloody diarrhea and a high fever, those with severe diarrhea following travelling, and those who grow specific bacteria or parasites in their stool. Loperamide may help decrease the number of bowel movements but is not recommended in those with severe disease.

About 1.7 to 5 billion cases of diarrhea occur per year. It is most common in developing countries, where young children get diarrhea on average three times a year. Total deaths from diarrhea are estimated at 1.53 million in 2019—down from 2.9 million in 1990. In 2012, it was the second most common cause of deaths in children younger than five (0.76 million or 11%). Frequent episodes of diarrhea are also a common cause of malnutrition and the most common cause in those younger than five years of age. Other long term problems that can result include stunted growth and poor intellectual development.

== Terminology ==
The word diarrhea is from the Ancient Greek διάρροια from διά dia "through" and ῥέω rheo "flow". Diarrhea is the spelling in American English, whereas diarrhoea is the spelling in British English. Canadian English uses both spellings.

Slang terms for the condition include "the runs", "the squirts" (or "squits" in Britain), "Hershey squirts", "Montezuma's Revenge", and "the trots".

== Definition ==
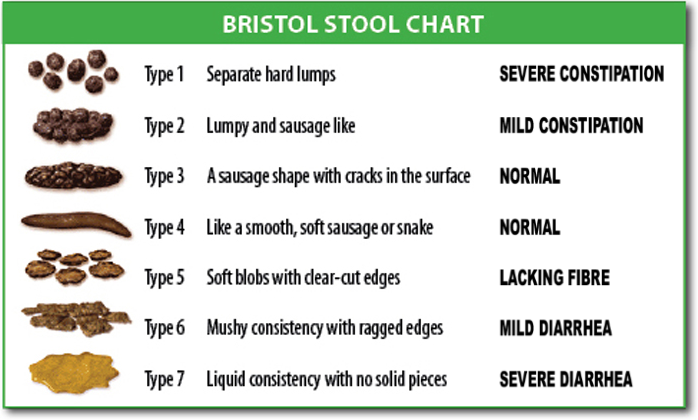
Bristol stool scale

Diarrhea is defined by the World Health Organization as having three or more loose or liquid stools per day, or as having more stools than is normal for that person.

Acute diarrhea is defined as an abnormally frequent discharge of semisolid or fluid fecal matter from the bowel, lasting less than 14 days, by World Gastroenterology Organization. Acute diarrhea that is watery may be known as AWD (Acute Watery Diarrhoea).

=== Secretory ===
Secretory diarrhea means that there is an increase in the active secretion, or there is an inhibition of absorption. There is little to no structural damage. The most common cause of this type of diarrhea is a cholera toxin that stimulates the secretion of anions, especially chloride ions (Cl^{–}). Therefore, to maintain a charge balance in the gastrointestinal tract, sodium (Na^{+}) is carried with it, along with water. In this type of diarrhea intestinal fluid secretion is isotonic with plasma even during fasting. It continues even when there is no oral food intake.

=== Osmotic ===
Osmotic diarrhea occurs when too much water is drawn into the bowels. If a person drinks solutions with excessive sugar or excessive salt, these can draw water from the body into the bowel and cause osmotic diarrhea. Osmotic diarrhea can also result from maldigestion (e.g., pancreatic disease or coeliac disease) in which the nutrients are left in the lumen to pull in water. It can also be caused by osmotic laxatives (which work to alleviate constipation by drawing water into the bowels). In healthy individuals, too much magnesium, vitamin C or undigested lactose can produce osmotic diarrhea and distention of the bowel. A person who has lactose intolerance can have difficulty absorbing lactose after an extraordinarily high intake of dairy products. In persons who have fructose malabsorption, excess fructose intake can also cause diarrhea. High-fructose foods that also have a high glucose content are more absorbable and less likely to cause diarrhea. Sugar alcohols such as sorbitol (often found in sugar-free foods) are difficult for the body to absorb and, in large amounts, may lead to osmotic diarrhea. In most of these cases, osmotic diarrhea stops when the offending agent (e.g., milk or sorbitol) is stopped.

=== Exudative ===
Exudative diarrhea occurs with the presence of blood and pus in the stool. This occurs with inflammatory bowel diseases, such as Crohn's disease or ulcerative colitis, and other severe infections such as E. coli or other forms of food poisoning.

=== Inflammatory ===
Inflammatory diarrhea occurs when there is damage to the mucosal lining or brush border, which leads to a passive loss of protein-rich fluids and a decreased ability to absorb these lost fluids. Features of all three of the other types of diarrhea can be found in this type of diarrhea. It can be caused by bacterial infections, viral infections, parasitic infections, or autoimmune problems such as inflammatory bowel diseases. It can also be caused by tuberculosis, colon cancer, and enteritis.

=== Dysentery ===
If there is blood visible in the stools, it is also known as dysentery. The blood is a trace of an invasion of bowel tissue. Dysentery is a symptom of, among others, Shigella, Entamoeba histolytica, and Salmonella.

== Health effects ==
Diarrheal disease may have a negative impact on multiple aspects of development. The Disease Control Priorities Project notes that "early childhood malnutrition resulting from any cause reduces physical fitness and work productivity in adults", and diarrhea is a primary cause of childhood malnutrition. Further, evidence suggests that diarrheal disease has significant impacts on mental development and health; it has been shown that, even when controlling for helminth infection and early breastfeeding, children who had experienced severe diarrhea had significantly lower scores on a series of tests of intelligence.

Diarrhea can cause electrolyte imbalances, kidney impairment, dehydration, and defective immune system responses. When oral drugs are administered, the efficiency of the drug is to produce a therapeutic effect and the lack of this effect may be due to the medication travelling too quickly through the digestive system, limiting the time that it can be absorbed. Clinicians try to treat the diarrheas by reducing the dosage of medication, changing the dosing schedule, discontinuation of the drug, and rehydration. The interventions to control the diarrhea are not often effective. Diarrhea can have a profound effect on the quality of life because fecal incontinence is one of the leading factors for placing older adults in long term care facilities (nursing homes).

== Causes ==
Diagram of the human gastrointestinal tract

In the latter stages of human digestion, ingested materials are inundated with water and digestive fluids such as gastric acid, bile, and digestive enzymes in order to break them down into their nutrient components, which are then absorbed into the bloodstream via the intestinal tract in the small intestine. Prior to defecation, the large intestine reabsorbs the water and other digestive solvents in the waste product in order to maintain proper hydration and overall equilibrium. Diarrhea occurs when the large intestine is prevented, for any number of reasons, from sufficiently absorbing the water or other digestive fluids from fecal matter, resulting in a liquid, or "loose", bowel movement.

Acute diarrhea is most commonly due to viral gastroenteritis with rotavirus, which accounts for 40% of cases in children under five. In travelers, however, bacterial infections predominate. Various toxins such as mushroom poisoning and drugs can also cause acute diarrhea.

Chronic diarrhea can be part of the presentations of a number of chronic medical conditions affecting the intestine. Common causes include ulcerative colitis, Crohn's disease, microscopic colitis, celiac disease, irritable bowel syndrome, and bile acid malabsorption.

=== Infections ===
There are many causes of infectious diarrhea, which include viruses, bacteria and parasites. Infectious diarrhea is frequently referred to as gastroenteritis. Norovirus is the most common cause of viral diarrhea in adults, but rotavirus is the most common cause in children under five years old. Adenovirus types 40 and 41, and astroviruses cause a significant number of infections. Shiga-toxin producing Escherichia coli, such as E. coli o157:h7, are the most common cause of infectious bloody diarrhea in the United States.

Campylobacter spp. are a common cause of bacterial diarrhea, but infections by Salmonella spp., Shigella spp. and some strains of Escherichia coli are also a frequent cause.

In the elderly, particularly those who have been treated with antibiotics for unrelated infections, a toxin produced by Clostridioides difficile often causes severe diarrhea.

Parasites, particularly protozoa e.g., Cryptosporidium spp., Giardia spp., Entamoeba histolytica, Blastocystis spp., Cyclospora cayetanensis, are frequently the cause of diarrhea that involves chronic infection. The broad-spectrum antiparasitic agent nitazoxanide has shown efficacy against many diarrhea-causing parasites.

Other infectious agents, such as parasites or bacterial toxins, may exacerbate symptoms. In sanitary living conditions where there is ample food and a supply of clean water, an otherwise healthy person usually recovers from viral infections in a few days. However, for ill or malnourished individuals, diarrhea can lead to severe dehydration and can become life-threatening.

==== Sanitation ====
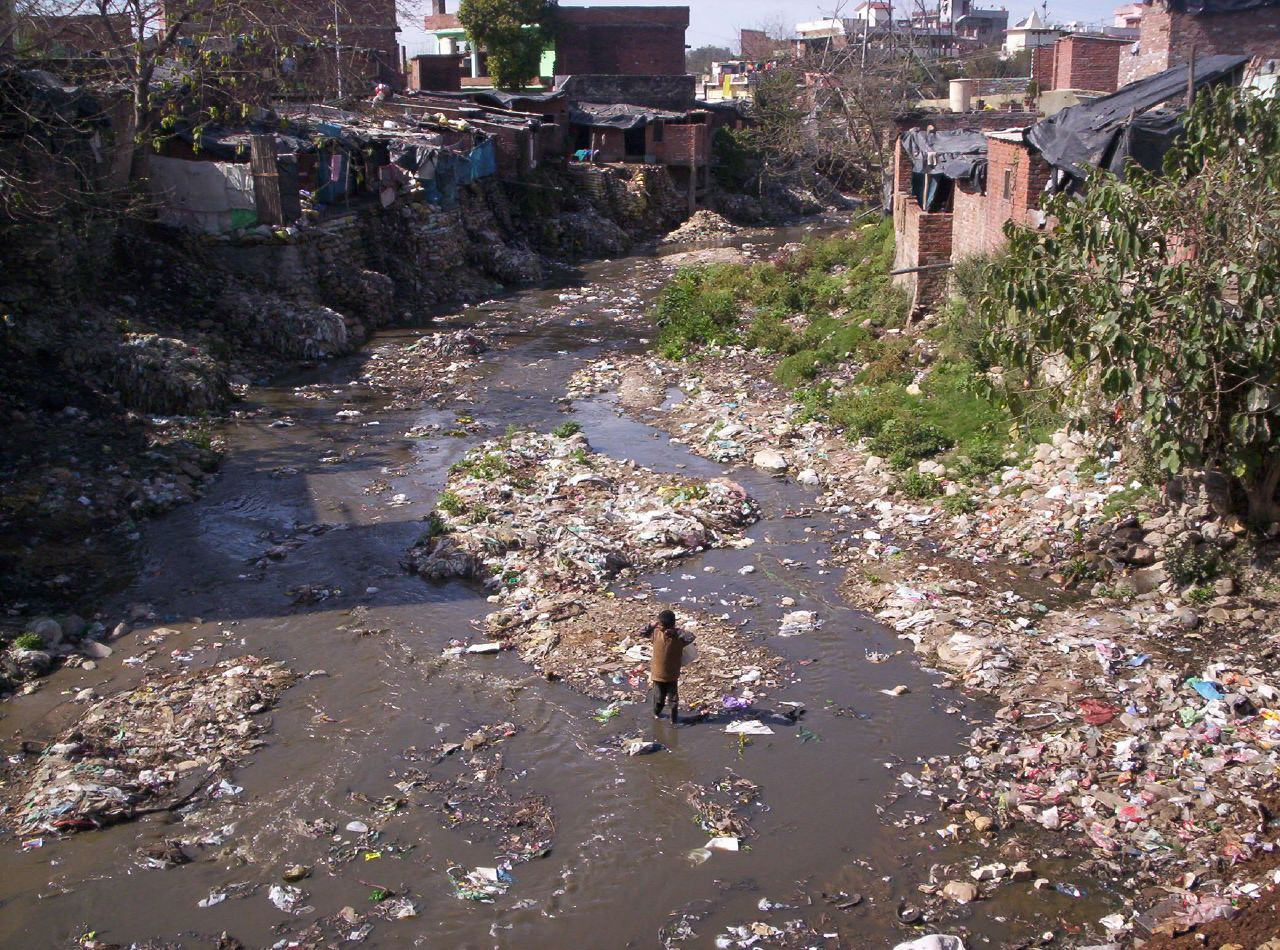
Poverty often leads to unhygienic living conditions, as in this community in the Indian Himalayas. Such conditions promote contraction of diarrheal diseases, as a result of poor sanitation and hygiene.

Open defecation is a leading cause of infectious diarrhea leading to death.

Poverty is a good indicator of the rate of infectious diarrhea in a population. This association does not stem from poverty itself, but rather from the conditions under which impoverished people live. The absence of certain resources compromises the ability of the poor to defend themselves against infectious diarrhea.

Poverty is associated with poor housing, crowding, dirt floors, lack of access to clean water or to sanitary disposal of fecal waste (sanitation), cohabitation with domestic animals that may carry human pathogens, and a lack of refrigerated storage for food, all of which increase the frequency of diarrhea ... Poverty also restricts the ability to provide age-appropriate, nutritionally balanced diets or to modify diets when diarrhea develops so as to mitigate and repair nutrient losses. The impact is exacerbated by the lack of adequate, available, and affordable medical care.

One of the most common causes of infectious diarrhea is a lack of clean water. Often, improper fecal disposal leads to contamination of groundwater. This can lead to widespread infection among a population, especially in the absence of water filtration or purification. Human feces contains a variety of potentially harmful human pathogens.

==== Nutrition ====
Proper nutrition is important for health and functioning, including the prevention of infectious diarrhea. It is especially important to young children who do not have a fully developed immune system. Zinc deficiency, a condition often found in children in developing countries, can have a significant impact on the development and proper functioning of the human immune system, even in mild cases. Indeed, this relationship between zinc deficiency and reduced immune functioning corresponds with an increased severity of infectious diarrhea. Children who have lowered levels of zinc have a greater number of instances of diarrhea, severe diarrhea, and diarrhea associated with fever. Similarly, vitamin A deficiency can cause an increase in the severity of diarrheal episodes. However, there is some discrepancy when it comes to the impact of vitamin A deficiency on the rate of disease. While some argue that a relationship does not exist between the rate of disease and vitamin A status, others suggest an increase in the rate associated with deficiency. Given that estimates suggest 127 million preschool children worldwide are vitamin A deficient, this population has the potential for increased risk of disease contraction.

=== Malabsorption ===
Malabsorption is the inability to absorb food fully, mostly from disorders in the small bowel, but also due to maldigestion from diseases of the pancreas.

Causes include:

- Enzyme deficiencies or mucosal abnormality, as in food allergy and food intolerance, such as celiac disease (gluten intolerance), lactose intolerance (intolerance to milk sugar, common in non-Europeans), and fructose malabsorption.
- Pernicious anemia, or impaired bowel function due to the inability to absorb vitamin B_{12},
- Loss of pancreatic secretions, which may be due to cystic fibrosis or pancreatitis,
- Structural defects, like short bowel syndrome (surgically removed bowel) and radiation fibrosis, such as usually follows cancer treatment and other drugs, including agents used in chemotherapy; and
- Certain drugs, like orlistat, which inhibits the absorption of fat.

=== Inflammatory bowel disease ===
The two overlapping types here are of unknown origin:

- Ulcerative colitis is marked by chronic bloody diarrhea and inflammation mostly affects the distal colon near the rectum.
- Crohn's disease typically affects fairly well demarcated segments of bowel in the colon and often affects the end of the small bowel.

=== Irritable bowel syndrome ===
Another possible cause of diarrhea is irritable bowel syndrome (IBS), which usually presents with abdominal discomfort relieved by defecation and unusual stool (diarrhea or constipation) for at least three days a week over the previous three months. Symptoms of diarrhea-predominant IBS can be managed through a combination of dietary changes, soluble fiber supplements and medications such as loperamide or codeine. About 30% of patients with diarrhea-predominant IBS have bile acid malabsorption diagnosed with an abnormal SeHCAT test.

=== Other diseases ===
Diarrhea can be caused by other diseases and conditions, namely:

- Chronic ethanol ingestion
- Hyperthyroidism
- Certain medications
- Bile acid malabsorption
- Ischemic bowel disease: This usually affects older people and can be due to blocked arteries.
- Microscopic colitis, a type of inflammatory bowel disease where changes are seen only on histological examination of colonic biopsies.
- Bile salt malabsorption (primary bile acid diarrhea) where excessive bile acids in the colon produce a secretory diarrhea.
- Hormone-secreting tumors: some hormones, e.g. serotonin, can cause diarrhea if secreted in excess (usually from a tumor).
- Chronic mild diarrhea in infants and toddlers may occur with no obvious cause and with no other ill effects; this condition is called toddler's diarrhea.
- Environmental enteropathy
- Radiation enteropathy following treatment for pelvic and abdominal cancers.
- Mast cell activation syndrome (MCAS)
- Drug withdrawal side effect.

=== Medications ===
Over 700 medications, such as penicillin, are known to cause diarrhea. The classes of medications that are known to cause diarrhea are laxatives, antacids, heartburn medications, antibiotics, anti-neoplastic drugs, anti-inflammatories as well as many dietary supplements.

== Pathophysiology ==
Ion transporters targeted by enteric infections
Function	Transporter
Absorption	NHE, SGLT1, ENaC, DRA
Secretion	CaCC, NKCC1, CFTR
Absorption and secretion	Sodium potassium ATPase

=== Evolution ===
According to two researchers, Nesse and Williams, diarrhea may function as an evolved expulsion defense mechanism. As a result, if it is stopped, there might be a delay in recovery. They cite in support of this argument research published in 1973 that found that treating Shigella with the anti-diarrhea drug (Co-phenotrope, Lomotil) caused people to stay feverish twice as long as those not so treated. The researchers indeed themselves observed that: "Lomotil may be contraindicated in shigellosis. Diarrhea may represent a defense mechanism".

== Diagnostic approach ==
The following types of diarrhea may indicate further investigation is needed:

- In infants
- Moderate or severe diarrhea in young children
- Associated with blood
- Continues for more than two days
- Associated non-cramping abdominal pain, fever, weight loss, etc.
- In travelers
- In food handlers, because of the potential to infect others;
- In institutions such as hospitals, child care centers, or geriatric and convalescent homes.

A severity score is used to aid diagnosis in children.

When diarrhea lasts for more than four weeks a number of further tests may be recommended including:

- Complete blood count and a ferritin if anemia is present
- Thyroid stimulating hormone
- Tissue transglutaminase for celiac disease
- Fecal calprotectin to exclude inflammatory bowel disease
- Stool tests for ova and parasites as well as for Clostridioides difficile
- A colonoscopy or fecal immunochemical testing for cancer, including biopsies to detect microscopic colitis
- Testing for bile acid diarrhea with SeHCAT, 7α-hydroxy-4-cholesten-3-one or fecal bile acids depending on availability
- Hydrogen breath test looking for lactose intolerance
- Further tests if immunodeficiency, pelvic radiation disease or small intestinal bacterial overgrowth suspected.

A 2019 guideline recommended that testing for ova and parasites was only needed in people who are at high risk though they recommend routine testing for giardia. Erythrocyte sedimentation rate (ESR) and C-reactive protein (CRP) were not recommended.

== Prevention ==
=== Sanitation ===
Numerous studies have shown that improvements in drinking water and sanitation (WASH) lead to decreased risks of diarrhoea. Such improvements might include for example use of water filters, provision of high-quality piped water and sewer connections.

In institutions, communities, and households, interventions that promote hand washing with soap lead to significant reductions in the incidence of diarrhea. The same applies to preventing open defecation at a community-wide level and providing access to improved sanitation. This includes use of toilets and implementation of the entire sanitation chain connected to the toilets (collection, transport, disposal or reuse of human excreta).

There is limited evidence that safe disposal of child or adult feces can prevent diarrheal disease.

==== Hand washing ====
Basic sanitation techniques can have a profound effect on the transmission of diarrheal disease. The implementation of hand washing using soap and water, for example, has been experimentally shown to reduce the incidence of disease by approximately 30–48%. Hand washing in developing countries, however, is compromised by poverty as acknowledged by the Centers for Disease Control and Prevention (CDC): "Handwashing is integral to disease prevention in all parts of the world; however, access to soap and water is limited in a number of less developed countries. This lack of access is one of many challenges to proper hygiene in less developed countries." Solutions to this barrier require the implementation of educational programs that encourage sanitary behaviours.

==== Water ====
Given that water contamination is a major means of transmitting diarrheal disease, efforts to provide clean water supply and improved sanitation have the potential to dramatically cut the rate of disease incidence. In fact, it has been proposed that we might expect an 88% reduction in child mortality resulting from diarrheal disease as a result of improved water sanitation and hygiene. Similarly, a meta-analysis of numerous studies on improving water supply and sanitation shows a 22–27% reduction in disease incidence, and a 21–30% reduction in mortality rate associated with diarrheal disease.

Chlorine treatment of water, for example, has been shown to reduce both the risk of diarrheal disease, and of contamination of stored water with diarrheal pathogens.

=== Vaccination ===
Immunization against the pathogens that cause diarrheal disease is a viable prevention strategy, however it does require targeting certain pathogens for vaccination. In the case of Rotavirus, which was responsible for around 6% of diarrheal episodes and 20% of diarrheal disease deaths in the children of developing countries, use of a Rotavirus vaccine in trials in 1985 yielded a slight (2–3%) decrease in total diarrheal disease incidence, while reducing overall mortality by 6–10%. Similarly, a Cholera vaccine showed a strong reduction in morbidity and mortality, though the overall impact of vaccination was minimal as Cholera is not one of the major causative pathogens of diarrheal disease. Since this time, more effective vaccines have been developed that have the potential to save many thousands of lives in developing nations, while reducing the overall cost of treatment, and the costs to society.

Rotavirus vaccine decreases the rates of diarrhea in a population. New vaccines against rotavirus, Shigella, Enterotoxigenic Escherichia coli (ETEC), and cholera are under development, as well as other causes of infectious diarrhea.

=== Nutrition ===
Dietary deficiencies in developing countries can be combated by promoting better eating practices. Zinc supplementation proved successful showing a significant decrease in the incidence of diarrheal disease compared to a control group. The majority of the literature suggests that vitamin A supplementation is advantageous in reducing disease incidence. Development of a supplementation strategy should take into consideration the fact that vitamin A supplementation was less effective in reducing diarrhea incidence when compared to vitamin A and zinc supplementation, and that the latter strategy was estimated to be significantly more cost effective.

==== Breastfeeding ====
Breastfeeding practices have been shown to have a dramatic effect on the incidence of diarrheal disease in poor populations. Studies across a number of developing nations have shown that those who receive exclusive breastfeeding during their first 6 months of life are better protected against infection with diarrheal diseases. One study in Brazil found that non-breastfed infants were 14 times more likely to die from diarrhea than exclusively breastfed infants. Exclusive breastfeeding is currently recommended for the first six months of an infant's life by the WHO, with continued breastfeeding until at least two years of age.

=== Others ===
Probiotics decrease the risk of diarrhea in those taking antibiotics. Insecticide spraying may reduce fly numbers and the risk of diarrhea in children in a setting where there is seasonal variations in fly numbers throughout the year.

== Management ==
In many cases of diarrhea, replacing lost fluid and salts is the only treatment needed. This is usually by mouth – oral rehydration therapy – or, in severe cases, intravenously. Diet restrictions such as the BRAT diet are no longer recommended. Research does not support the limiting of milk to children as doing so has no effect on duration of diarrhea. To the contrary, WHO recommends that children with diarrhea continue to eat as sufficient nutrients are usually still absorbed to support continued growth and weight gain, and that continuing to eat also speeds up recovery of normal intestinal functioning. CDC recommends that children and adults with cholera also continue to eat. There is no evidence that early refeeding in children can cause an increase in inappropriate use of intravenous fluid, episodes of vomiting, and risk of having persistent diarrhea.

Medications such as loperamide (Imodium) and bismuth subsalicylate may be beneficial; however they may be contraindicated in certain situations.

=== Fluids ===
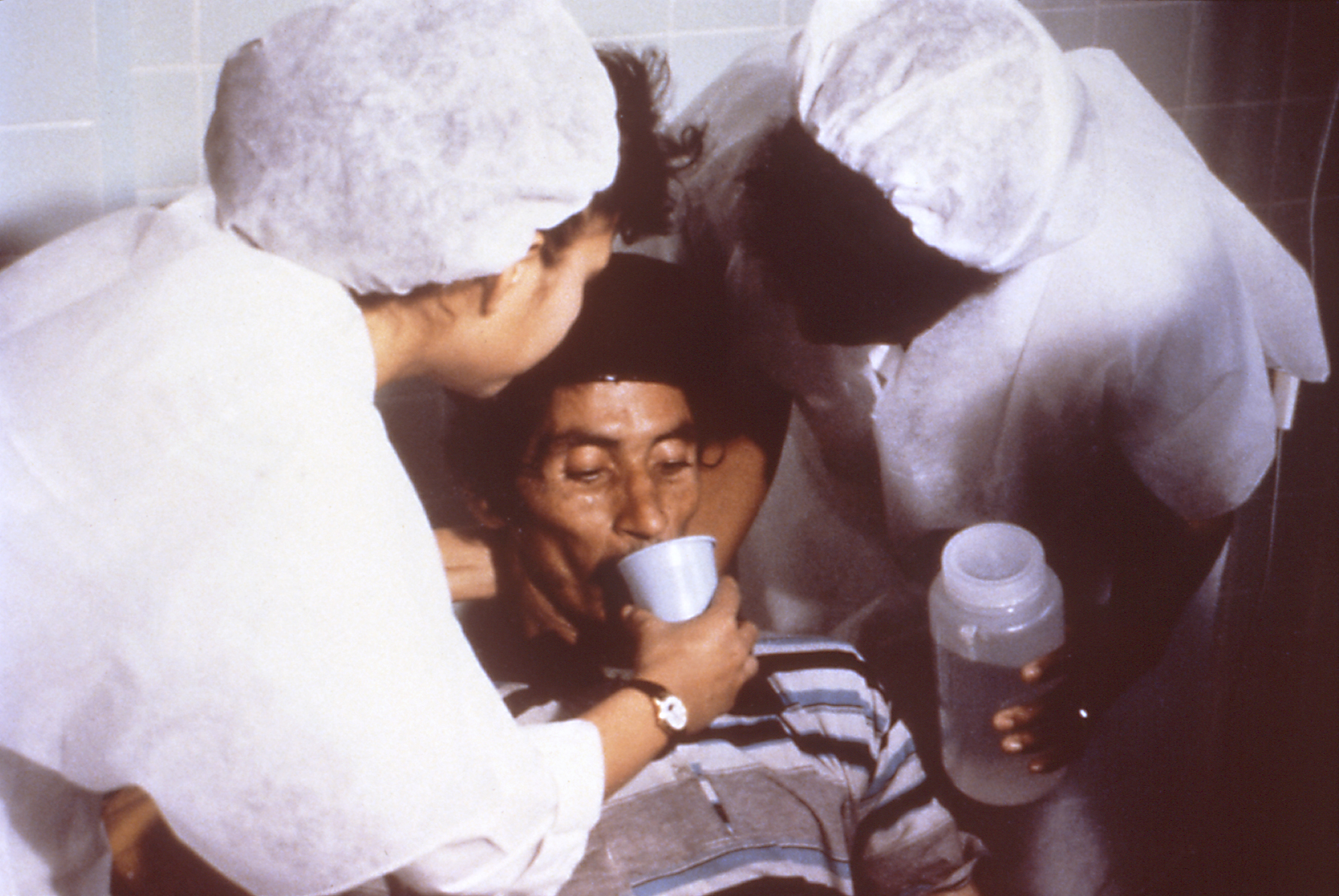
A person consuming oral rehydration solution

Oral rehydration solution (ORS) (a slightly sweetened and salty water) can be used to prevent dehydration. Standard home solutions such as salted rice water, salted yogurt drinks, vegetable and chicken soups with salt can be given. Home solutions such as water in which cereal has been cooked, unsalted soup, green coconut water, weak tea (unsweetened), and unsweetened fresh fruit juices can have from half a teaspoon to full teaspoon of salt (from one-and-a-half to three grams) added per liter. Clean plain water can also be one of several fluids given. There are commercial solutions such as Pedialyte, and relief agencies such as UNICEF widely distribute packets of salts and sugar. A WHO publication for physicians recommends a homemade ORS consisting of one liter water with one teaspoon salt (3 grams) and two tablespoons sugar (18 grams) added (approximately the "taste of tears"). Rehydration Project recommends adding the same amount of sugar but only one-half a teaspoon of salt, stating that this more dilute approach is less risky with very little loss of effectiveness. Both agree that drinks with too much sugar or salt can make dehydration worse.

Appropriate amounts of supplemental zinc and potassium should be added if available. But the availability of these should not delay rehydration. As WHO points out, the most important thing is to begin preventing dehydration as early as possible. In another example of prompt ORS hopefully preventing dehydration, CDC recommends for the treatment of cholera continuing to give Oral Rehydration Solution during travel to medical treatment.

Vomiting often occurs during the first hour or two of treatment with ORS, especially if a child drinks the solution too quickly, but this seldom prevents successful rehydration since most of the fluid is still absorbed. WHO recommends that if a child vomits, to wait five or ten minutes and then start to give the solution again more slowly.

Drinks especially high in simple sugars, such as soft drinks and fruit juices, are not recommended in children under five as they may increase dehydration. A too rich solution in the gut draws water from the rest of the body, just as if the person were to drink sea water. Plain water may be used if more specific and effective ORT preparations are unavailable or are not palatable. Additionally, a mix of both plain water and drinks perhaps too rich in sugar and salt can alternatively be given to the same person, with the goal of providing a medium amount of sodium overall. A nasogastric tube can be used in young children to administer fluids if warranted.

=== Eating ===
The WHO recommends a child with diarrhea continue to be fed. Continued feeding speeds the recovery of normal intestinal function. In contrast, children whose food is restricted have diarrhea of longer duration and recover intestinal function more slowly. The WHO states "Food should never be withheld and the child's usual foods should not be diluted. Breastfeeding should always be continued." In the specific example of cholera, the CDC makes the same recommendation. Breast-fed infants with diarrhea often choose to breastfeed more, and should be encouraged to do so. In young children who are not breast-fed and live in the developed world, a lactose-free diet may be useful to speed recovery. Eating food containing soluble fibre may help, but insoluble fibre might make it worse.

=== Medications ===
Antidiarrheal agents can be classified into four different groups: antimotility, antisecretory, adsorbent, and anti-infectious. While antibiotics are beneficial in certain types of acute diarrhea, they are usually not used except in specific situations. There are concerns that antibiotics may increase the risk of hemolytic uremic syndrome in people infected with Escherichia coli O157:H7. In resource-poor countries, treatment with antibiotics may be beneficial. However, some bacteria are developing antibiotic resistance, particularly Shigella. Antibiotics can also cause diarrhea, and antibiotic-associated diarrhea is the most common adverse effect of treatment with general antibiotics.

While bismuth compounds (Pepto-Bismol) decreased the number of bowel movements in those with travelers' diarrhea, they do not decrease the length of illness. Anti-motility agents like loperamide are also effective at reducing the number of stools but not the duration of disease. These agents should be used only if bloody diarrhea is not present.

Diosmectite, a natural aluminomagnesium silicate clay, is effective in alleviating symptoms of acute diarrhea in children, and also has some effects in chronic functional diarrhea, radiation-induced diarrhea, and chemotherapy-induced diarrhea. Another absorbent agent used for the treatment of mild diarrhea is kaopectate.

Racecadotril an antisecretory medication may be used to treat diarrhea in children and adults. It has better tolerability than loperamide, as it causes less constipation and flatulence. However, it has little benefit in improving acute diarrhea in children.

Bile acid sequestrants such as cholestyramine can be effective in chronic diarrhea due to bile acid malabsorption. Therapeutic trials of these drugs are indicated in chronic diarrhea if bile acid malabsorption cannot be diagnosed with a specific test, such as SeHCAT retention.

=== Alternative therapies ===
Green bananas improved recovery, reduced dehydration and prevented prolonged diarrhea in children with diarrhea. The benefit was attributed to its production of short-chain fatty acids in the colon from its resistant starch content, which enhances colonic water and electrolyte absorption.

Zinc supplementation may benefit children over six months old with diarrhea in areas with high rates of malnourishment or zinc deficiency. This supports the World Health Organization guidelines for zinc, but not in the very young.

A Cochrane Review from 2020 concludes that probiotics make little or no difference to people who have diarrhea lasting 2 days or longer and that there is no proof that they reduce its duration. The probiotic Lactobacillus can help prevent antibiotic-associated diarrhea in adults but possibly not children. For those with lactose intolerance, taking digestive enzymes containing lactase when consuming dairy products often improves symptoms.

== Epidemiology ==
Worldwide in 2004, approximately 2.5 billion cases of diarrhea occurred, which resulted in 1.5 million deaths among children under the age of five. Greater than half of these were in Africa and South Asia. This is down from a death rate of 4.5 million in 1980 for gastroenteritis. Diarrhea remains the second leading cause of infant mortality (16%) after pneumonia (17%) in this age group.

The majority of such cases occur in the developing world, with over half of the recorded cases of childhood diarrhea occurring in Africa and Asia, with 696 million and 1.2 billion cases, respectively, compared to only 480 million in the rest of the world.

Infectious diarrhea resulted in about 0.7 million deaths in children under five years old in 2011 and 250 million lost school days. In the Americas, diarrheal disease accounts for a total of 10% of deaths among children aged 1–59 months while in South East Asia, it accounts for 31.3% of deaths. It is estimated that around 21% of child mortalities in developing countries are due to diarrheal disease.

The World Health Organization has reported that "deaths due to diarrhoeal diseases have dropped by 45%, from sixth leading cause of death in 2000 to thirteenth in 2021."

Climate change can cause an increase in diarrhoeal diseases. Bacteria proliferate with an increase with ambient temperature, and following heavy rainfall and flooding events. Heavy rainfall and flooding can also affect pathogen transmission by impacting sanitation and/or drinking water treatment infrastructure, contaminating drinking water sources or food products.

Even though diarrhea is best known in humans, it affects many other species, notably among primates. The cecal appendix, when present, appears to afford some protection against diarrhea to young primates.

Deaths from diarrheal diseases

Diarrheal diseases death rate

Diarrheal diseases death rate

== See also ==
- Climate change and infectious diseases
- Mucorrhea – Discharge of mucus
- Fernando Mazariegos – Guatemalan scientist (1938–2018)
