= Enterohepatic circulation =

Circulation of substances in the human digestive system

Enterohepatic circulation of drugs.

Enterohepatic circulation is the circulation of biliary acids, bilirubin, drugs or other substances from the liver to the bile, followed by entry into the small intestine, absorption by the enterocyte and transport back to the liver. Enterohepatic circulation is an especially important concept in the field of toxicology as many lipophilic xenobiotics undergo this process causing repeated liver damage.

== Biliary acids ==
=== The circuit ===
Hepatocytes metabolize cholesterol to cholic acid and chenodeoxycholic acid. These lipid-soluble bile acids are conjugated (reversibly attached) mainly to glycine or taurine molecules to form water soluble primary conjugated bile acids, sometimes called "bile salts". These bile acids travel to the gall bladder during the interdigestive phase for storage and to the descending part of the duodenum via the common bile duct through the major duodenal papilla during digestion. 95% of the bile acids which are delivered to the duodenum will be recycled by the enterohepatic circulation.

Due to the pH of the small intestine, most of the bile acids are ionized and mostly occur as their sodium salts which are then called “primary conjugated bile salts.” In the lower small intestine and colon, bacteria dehydroxylate some of the primary bile salts to form secondary conjugated bile salts (which are still water-soluble). Along the proximal and distal ileum, these conjugated primary bile salts are reabsorbed actively into hepatic portal circulation. Bacteria deconjugate some of the primary and secondary conjugated bile salts back to lipid-soluble bile acids, which are passively absorbed into hepatic portal circulation. Finally, the conjugated bile acids which remained un-ionized conjugated bile acids are passively absorbed.

Venous blood from the ileum goes straight into the portal vein and then into the liver sinusoids. There, hepatocytes extract bile acids very efficiently, and little escapes the healthy liver into systemic circulation.

The net effect of enterohepatic recirculation is that each bile salt molecule is reused about 20 times, often multiple times during a single digestive phase.

=== Function ===
The presence of biliary acids in the intestines helps in absorption of fats and other substances.

== Bilirubin ==
Bilirubin is conjugated with glucuronic acid in the liver by the enzyme glucuronyltransferase, making it soluble in water. Much of it goes into the bile and thus out into the small intestine. Although 20% of the secreted bilirubinoid bile is reabsorbed by the small intestine, conjugated bilirubin is not reabsorbed in small intestine. All conjugated bilirubin in the large intestine is metabolised by colonic bacteria to urobilinogen, which is then further oxidized to urobilin and stercobilin. Urobilin, stercobilin and their degradation products give feces its brown color. However, just like bile, some of the urobilinogen reabsorbed is resecreted in the bile which is also part of enterohepatic circulation. The rest of the reabsorbed urobilinogen is excreted in the urine where it is converted to an oxidized form, urobilin, which gives urine its characteristic yellow color.

== Drugs ==
Chloramphenicol, aspirin, paracetamol, diazepam, lorazepam, morphine, metronidazole. Not only drugs but also endogenous substrates like bilirubin, steroidal hormones and thyroxine utilize this pathway.

Enterohepatic circulation of drugs describes the process by which drugs are conjugated to glucuronic acid in the liver, excreted into bile, metabolized back into the free drug by intestinal bacteria, and the drug is then reabsorbed into plasma. For many drugs that undergo this process, lower doses of drugs can be therapeutically effective because elimination is reduced by the 'recycling' of the drug. But for a small number of drugs that are very toxic to the intestine (e.g. irinotecan), these molecules which would not otherwise be very toxic can become so because of this process, and therefore inhibition of this step can be protective. For the majority of drugs which undergo enterohepatic circulation that are not toxic to the intestine, inhibition of this process leads to a reduction of the levels of drug and reduced therapeutic effect. For example, antibiotics that kill gut bacteria often reduce enterohepatic drug circulation and this requires a temporary increase of the drug's dose until the antibiotic use is discontinued and the gut repopulates with bacteria. This effect of antibiotics on enterohepatic circulation of other drugs is one of several types of drug interactions.

== Pharmacokinetic Models of enterohepatic circulation ==
Pharmacokinetic models of the enterohepatic circulation process has been summarized in a recent article.

== See also ==
- Enteroenteric circulation
- Moritz Schiff
