= Gallbladder disease =

- Other names: Biliary disease, Hepatobiliary disease
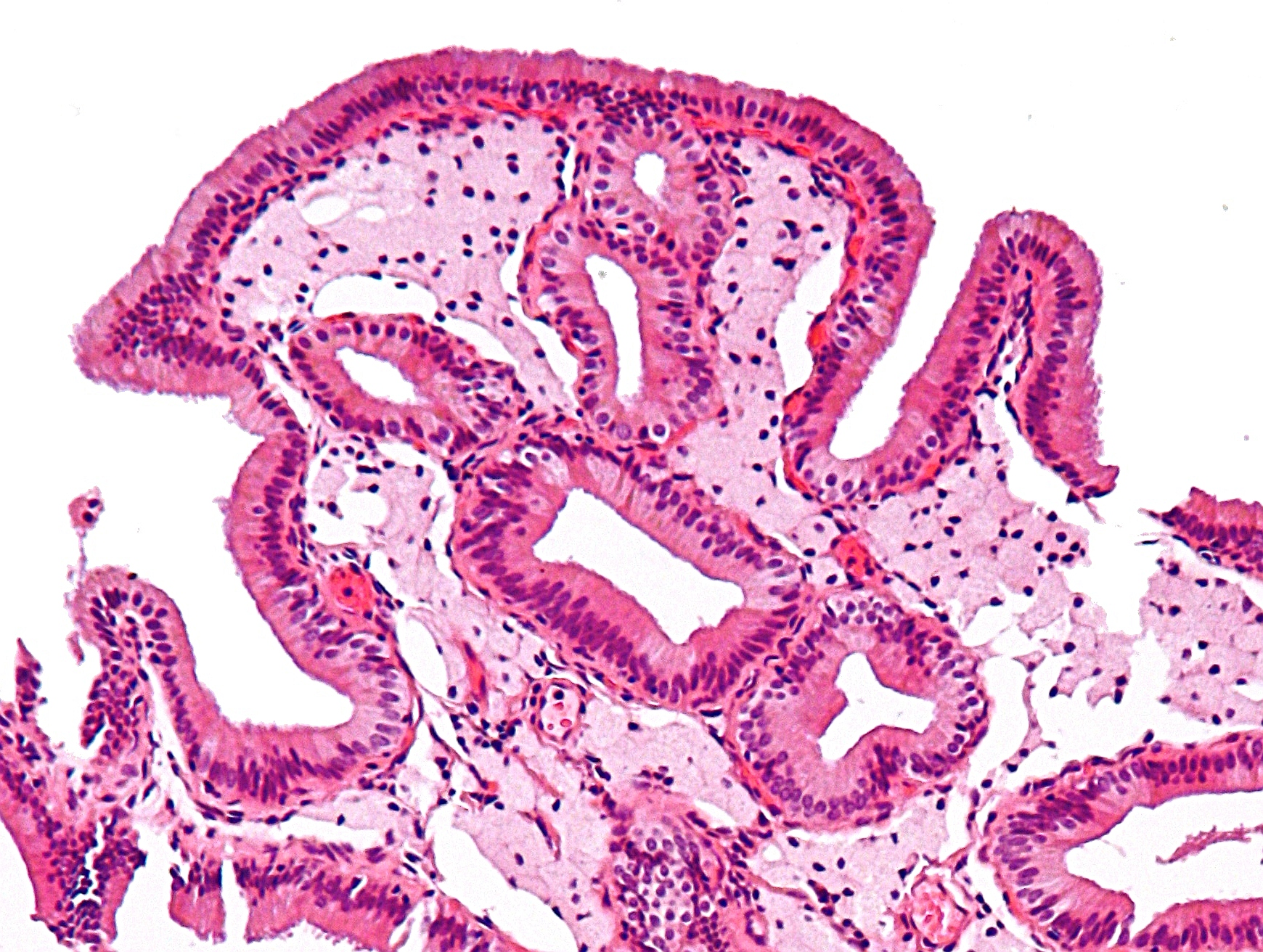
- Micrograph of cholesterolosis of the gallbladder, a very common gallbladder disease. Cholecystectomy specimen. H&E stain.
- Specialty: Gastroenterology

Gallbladder diseases are diseases involving the gallbladder and is closely linked to biliary disease, with the most common cause being gallstones (cholelithiasis).

The gallbladder is designed to aid in the digestion of fats by concentrating and storing the bile made in the liver and transferring it through the biliary tract to the digestive system through bile ducts that connect the liver, gallbladder, and the Sphincter of Oddi. The gallbladder is controlled on a neurohormonal basis, with Cholecystokinin (CCK) leading to the contraction and release of bile into the bile ducts. Other hormones allow for the relaxation and further storing of bile. A disruption in the hormones, ducts, or gallbladder can lead to disease. Gallstones are the most common disease and can lead to other diseases, including Cholecystitis, inflammation of the gallbladder, and gallstone pancreatitis when the gallstone blocks the pancreatic duct. Treatment is considered for symptomatic disease and can vary from surgical to non-surgical treatment.

About 104 million new cases of gallbladder and biliary disease occurred in 2013.

== Signs and symptoms ==
Gallbladder disease presents chiefly with abdominal pain located in the right upper abdomen. This pain is described as biliary colic. Pain typically occurs suddenly and radiates to the right shoulder and back, depending on several factors, including specific diseases. It can either be constant or episodic and last from minutes to hours. Other common symptoms with gallbladder disease and biliary colic are nausea and vomiting. With conditions such as cholecystitis and choledocholithiasis, fever may be present.

During the physical examination, the patient will present with Murphy's sign. This maneuver requires the physician to grab the lower part of the right ribs and curl their fingers under them. A positive test elicits pain with deep inspiration and is indicative of inflammation of the gallbladder, cholecystitis. With positive Murphy's sign, deep palpation of the abdomen also elicits pain. In these cases, physicians will need to rule out peritonitis, inflammation of the abdominal cavity. A negative Murphy's sign does not rule out all gallbladder diseases such as ascending cholangitis. Using an ultrasound transducer supplanting a physician's hands during an abdominal ultrasound can detect a positive Murphy's sign. The sign also has over a 90% positive and negative predictive value for acute cholecystitis

=== Gallstones ===
Gallstones may develop in the gallbladder as well as elsewhere in the biliary tract. If gallstones in the gallbladder are symptomatic, surgical removal of the gallbladder, known as cholecystectomy may be indicated.

Gallstones form when the tenuous balance of solubility of biliary lipids tips in favor of precipitation of cholesterol, unconjugated bilirubin, or bacterial degradation products of biliary lipids. For cholesterol gallstones, metabolic alterations in hepatic cholesterol secretion combine with changes in gallbladder motility and intestinal bacterial degradation of bile salts to destabilize cholesterol carriers in bile and produce cholesterol crystals. For black pigment gallstones, changes in heme metabolism or bilirubin absorption lead to increased bilirubin concentrations and precipitation of calcium bilirubinate. In contrast, mechanical obstruction of the biliary tract is the major factor leading to bacterial degradation and precipitation of biliary lipids in brown pigment stones.

== Risk factors ==
=== Pregnancy ===
During pregnancy when female sex hormones are naturally raised, biliary sludge (particulate material derived from bile that is composed of cholesterol, calcium bilirubinate, and mucin) appears in 5% to 30% of women. Resolution frequently transpires during the post-partum period: sludge disappears in two-thirds; small (<1 cm) gallstones (microlithiasis) vanish in one-third, but definitive gallstones become established in ~5%. Additional risk factors for stone formation during pregnancy include obesity (prior to the pregnancy), reduced high density lipoprotein (HDL) cholesterol and the metabolic syndrome.

=== Hormonal contraceptives ===
Women are almost twice as likely as men to form gallstones especially during the fertile years; the gap narrows after the menopause. The underlying mechanism is female sex hormones; parity, oral contraceptive use and estrogen replacement therapy are established risk factors for cholesterol gallstone formation. Female sex hormones adversely influence hepatic bile secretion and gallbladder function. Estrogens increase cholesterol secretion and diminish bile salt secretion, while progestins act by reducing bile salt secretion and impairing gallbladder emptying leading to stasis. A new 4th generation progestin, drospirenone, used in some oral contraceptives may further heighten the risk of gallstone disease and cholecystectomy; however, the increased risk is quite modest and not likely to be clinically meaningful.

A retrospective (historical) cohort study was performed on a very large data base including 1980 and 1981 Medicaid billing data from the states of Michigan and Minnesota in which 138,943 users of OCs were compared with 341,478 nonusers. Oral contraceptives were shown as risk factors for gallbladder disease, although the risk is of sufficient magnitude to be of potential clinical importance only in young women.

The 1984 Royal College of General Practitioners' Oral Contraception Study suggests that, in the long-term, oral contraceptives are not associated with any increased risk of gallbladder disease, although there is an acceleration of the disease in those women susceptible to it.

Newer research suggests otherwise. A 1993 meta-analysis concludes that oral contraceptive use is associated with a slightly and transiently increased rate of gallbladder disease, but confirms that modern low-dose oral contraceptives are safer than older formulas, though an effect cannot be excluded.

A 2001 comparative study of the IMS LifeLink Health Plan Claims Database interpreted that in a large cohort of women using oral contraceptives, there was found a small, statistically significant increase in the risk of gallbladder disease associated with desogestrel, drospirenone and norethisterone compared with levonorgestrel. No statistically significant increase in risk was associated with the other formulations of oral contraceptive (etynodiol diacetate, norgestrel and norgestimate).

=== Menopausal hormone therapy ===
While some observational studies had suggested that estrogens increase the risk for gallbladder disease by as much as twofold to fourfold, such an association had not been reported consistently. More recent randomized clinical trial data among postmenopausal women now support a causal role for oral menopausal hormone therapy estrogens. Confirming the positive finding of another large study, the landmark Women's Health Initiative (WHI) reported very significant increases (p < 0.001) for risk of gallbladder disease or surgery attributed to treatments with both estrogen alone (conjugated equine estrogen; CEE) and estrogen-plus-progestin (conjugated equine estrogen with medroxyprogesterone; CEE+MPA ). Specifically, a 67% increase (CEE versus placebo) and 59% increase (CEE+MPA versus placebo) among healthy postmenopausal women that reported either having had a hysterectomy (n = 8376) or not (n = 14203) prior to randomization, respectively.

=== Other factors ===
A prospective study in 1994 noted that body mass index remains the strongest predictor of symptomatic gallstones among young women. Other risk factors are having over four pregnancies, weight gain, and cigarette smoking. Alcohol was shown to have an inverse relationship between use and gallbladder disease.

== Diseases of the gallbladder ==
- Cholelithiasis (gallstones) are typically asymptomatic but can cause biliary pain episodically combined with other signs and symptoms of gallbladder disease such as nausea, vomiting, and pain radiating to the back. The curative treatment of symptomatic gallstones is a cholecystectomy. Abdominal pain can be confused with other gut disorders and will not relieve the pain in these instances.
- Cholecystitis, inflammation of the gallbladder can occur in both acute and chronic cases. Ultrasound is the diagnostic test of choice by showing an increased gallbladder wall thickness. Additionally, in acute cases, a leukocytosis, an increase in white blood cell count, is found. In chronic cases, a cholecystectomy is curative but is treated with medication as an alternative therapy for older patients. While in acute cases, patients take antibiotics for complications such as abscesses, pain control, and nothing to eat until a cholecystectomy.
- Gallbladder polyp is a growth in the gallbladder from various causes, with the most common being cholesterol polyp. Some can cause upper abdominal pain, while others remain asymptomatic. The size and symptoms determine the course of treatment, and those with smaller polyps may undergo routine monitoring for the growth of polyps. Larger polyps greater than 10mm will require cholecystectomy, gallbladder removal due to potential malignant qualities.
- Gallbladder cancer (Malignant neoplasm of the gallbladder) is rare, and most of the time is adenocarcinoma. As most early-stage cancers are asymptomatic, neoplasm of the gallbladder is found in late stages and has a poor prognosis. Multiple hypotheses have been formed about an individual's susceptibility to cancer with notations of increased susceptibility in patients with cholecystitis, gallstones, specific ethnicities, gallbladder polyps, and lifestyle diseases such as obesity. Symptoms include persistent right upper quadrant pain, jaundice, palpable mass.
- Biliary dyskinesia is a disease with the abnormal release of bile from the gallbladder leading to chronic biliary colic. Diagnosis is based on several studies examining the most common cause of gallstones and looking at the ejection fraction through a HIDA scan with cholecystokinin. This hormone causes bile release from the gallbladder.
- Postcholecystectomy syndrome (cholesterosis, hydrops, perforation, fistula)
- Xanthogranulomatous cholecystitis is a rare form of gallbladder disease which mimics gallbladder cancer although it is not cancerous. It was first discovered and reported in the medical literature in 1976 by J.J. McCoy, Jr., and colleagues.

== Diagnosis ==
A diagnostic workup is based on the most likely diagnosis. In testing for gallbladder disease, specifically, liver panel tests and pancreatic enzymes such as lipase will be within normal limits. There can be a mild elevation in alkaline phosphatase and bilirubin in some instances, such as cholecystitis. If gallstones are blocking other biliary tract areas causing pancreatic gallstones or choledocholithiasis, elevated liver panel, pancreatic enzymes, and bilirubin will be noted.

Ultrasound is the diagnostic imaging of choice to examine for thickening of the gallbladder walls, polyps, pericholecystic fluid, and gallstones. A positive Murphy's sign may also be noted using the ultrasound transducer. Another imaging modality is using cholescintigraphy to examine hepatic function. This scan assesses if the gallbladder is functioning as it is supposed to with a controlled amount of hormone. In regards to a suspected choledocholithiasis, a endoscopic retrograde cholangiopancreatography (ERCP) is used in both the diagnosis and treatment as it can remove the stones that are blocking the bile ducts causing choledocholithiasis.

== Treatment ==
In patients with an asymptomatic disease where a gallstone or small polyp was found incidentally, no further treatment is undertaken until symptoms arise. When an individual has symptomatic gallbladder disease and early-stage cancer, a cholecystectomy is utilized. A cholecystectomy is controversial in advanced cancer due to the low 5-year survival rate, especially if regional lymph nodes are involved. Symptoms of gallbladder disease typically decrease after cholecystectomy unless the abdominal pain was caused by other digestive tract diseases such as irritable bowel syndrome.

Nonsurgical treatment of gallstones and cholecystitis includes medication (for example chenodeoxycholic acid and ursodiol) to dissolve the stones. Because of side effects, ursodiol is more commonly chosen. It will take approximately two years to dissolve small stones with medications. Other avenues to reduce the modifiable risk factors that one may have for gallstones by reducing weight, dietary changes to lower cholesterol, and triglycerides.

== See also ==
- Gallbladder polyp
