= List of hepato-biliary diseases =

Hepato-biliary diseases include liver diseases and biliary diseases. Their study is known as hepatology.

== Liver diseases ==
=== Viral hepatitis ===
- Acute hepatitis A
- Acute hepatitis B
- Acute hepatitis C
- Acute hepatitis D – this is a superinfection with the delta-agent in a patient already infected with hepatitis B
- Acute hepatitis E
- Chronic viral hepatitis
- Other viral hepatitis viruses may exist but their relation to the disease is not firmly established like the previous ones (hepatitis F, GB virus C, hepatitis X)

=== Other infectious diseases ===
- Hepatitis:
  - cytomegalovirus infection
  - herpesviral: herpes simplex infection
- Toxoplasmosis
- Hepatosplenic schistosomiasis
- Portal hypertension in schistosomiasis
- Liver disease in syphilis
- Epstein–Barr virus infection
- yellow fever virus infection
- rubella virus infection
- leptospirosis
- Echinococcosis
- Amoebiasis

=== Other inflammatory diseases ===
- liver abscess
- autoimmune hepatitis
- primary biliary cholangitis (primary biliary cirrhosis)
- phlebitis of the portal vein
- granulomatous hepatitis
  - berylliosis
  - sarcoidosis
- nonalcoholic steatohepatitis (NASH)

=== Alcohol ===
This may cause fatty liver, hepatitis, fibrosis and sclerosis leading to cirrhosis and finally liver failure.

=== Toxins ===
This includes mostly drug-induced hepatotoxicity, (DILI) which may generate many different patterns over liver disease, including

- cholestasis
- necrosis
- acute hepatitis and chronic hepatitis of different forms,
- cirrhosis
- Effects of Acetaminophen (Tylenol)
- other rare disorders like focal nodular hyperplasia, Hepatic fibrosis, peliosis hepatis and veno-occlusive disease.

Liver damage is part of Reye syndrome.

=== Tumours ===
Malignant neoplasm of liver and intrahepatic bile ducts. The most frequent forms are metastatic malignant neoplasm of liver)

- liver cell carcinoma
  - hepatocellular carcinoma
  - hepatoma
- cholangiocarcinoma
- hepatoblastoma
- angiosarcoma of liver
- Kupffer cell sarcoma
- other sarcomas of liver

Benign neoplasm of liver include hepatic hemangiomas, hepatic adenomas, and focal nodular hyperplasia (FNH).

=== End-stage liver disease ===
Chronic liver diseases like chronic hepatitis, chronic alcohol abuse or chronic toxic liver disease may cause

- liver failure and hepatorenal syndrome
- fibrosis and cirrhosis of liver

Cirrhosis may also occur in primary biliary cirrhosis. Rarely, cirrhosis is congenital.

=== Metabolic diseases ===
- metabolic diseases (chapter E in ICD-10)
  - haemochromatosis
  - Wilson's disease
  - Gilbert's syndrome
  - Crigler–Najjar syndrome
  - Dubin–Johnson syndrome
  - Rotor syndrome
  - Bile acid synthesis disorders

=== Vascular disorders ===
- chronic passive congestion of liver
- central haemorrhagic necrosis of liver
- infarction of liver
- peliosis hepatis
- veno-occlusive disease
- portal hypertension
- Budd–Chiari syndrome

=== Cysts ===
- Congenital cystic disease of the liver
- Cysts caused by Echinococcus
- Polycystic liver disease

=== Others ===
Amyloid degeneration of liver

== Gallbladder and biliary tract diseases ==
- malignant neoplasm of the gallbladder
- malignant neoplasm of other parts of biliary tract
  - extrahepatic bile duct
  - ampulla of Vater
- cholelithiasis
- cholecystitis
- others (excluding postcholecystectomy syndrome), but including
  - other obstructions of the gallbladder (like strictures)
  - hydrops, perforation, fistula
  - cholesterolosis
  - biliary dyskinesia
- ICD-10 code K83: other diseases of the biliary tract:
  - cholangitis (including ascending cholangitis and primary sclerosing cholangitis)
  - obstruction, perforation, fistula of biliary tract (bile duct)
  - spasm of sphincter of Oddi
  - biliary cyst
  - biliary atresia
