= Biliary disease =

Diseases affecting the production and transportation of bile

Biliary diseases include gallbladder disease and biliary tract diseases. In 2013 they resulted in 106,000 deaths, up from 81,000 deaths in 1990.

== Types ==
- malignant neoplasm of the gallbladder
- malignant neoplasm of other parts of biliary tract
  - extrahepatic bile duct
  - ampulla of Vater
- cholelithiasis
- cholecystitis
- others (excluding postcholecystectomy syndrome), but including
  - other obstructions of the gallbladder (like strictures)
  - hydrops, perforation, fistula
  - cholesterolosis
  - biliary dyskinesia
- K83: other diseases of the biliary tract:
  - cholangitis (including ascending cholangitis and primary sclerosing cholangitis)
  - obstruction, perforation, fistula of biliary tract
  - spasm of sphincter of Oddi
  - biliary cyst
  - biliary atresia
