= Gallbladder cancer =

- Specialty: Gastroenterology Hepatology Oncology
- Symptoms: Abdominal pain, Bloating, Fever, Unexplained weight loss, Nausea, Yellowing of the skin, although some people may have no symptoms
- Complications: Cancer spreading to other parts of the body
- Usual onset: Above 65 years old
- Types: Adenocarcinoma (most common), Squamous cell carcinoma (more rare)
- Causes: Unknown
- Risk factors: History of Gallstones and other Gallbladder diseases Smoking
- Diagnostic method: Blood tests, medical imaging, examination of the Bile duct
- Differential diagnosis: Other types of cancer in the Digestive system
- Treatment: Surgery, Radiation therapy, Chemotherapy
- Prognosis: Five-year survival rate ~19% (USA) (January, 2020)
- Frequency: ~3,700 cases per year (USA)
- Deaths: ~2,000 deaths per year (USA)

Gallbladder cancer is a relatively uncommon cancer, with an incidence of fewer than 2 cases per 100,000 people per year in the United States. It is less uncommon in Central and South America, central and eastern Europe, Japan and northern India; it is also common in certain ethnic groups such as Native American and Hispanic peoples. Gallbladder adenocarcinoma accounts for approximately 90% of gallbladder cancers. GLOBOCAN 2022 estimated 122,469 new cases and 89,045 deaths from gallbladder cancer in 2022. South Central Asia and Eastern Asia, particularly India and China, bear the largest absolute burdens, and some South American countries, like Bolivia, have among the highest age-standardized rates. This highlights the regional disparities in gallbladder cancer incidence and mortality.

If diagnosed early enough, the cancer may be cured by removing the gallbladder, part of the liver and associated lymph nodes. However, the cancer is often only found after patients present with symptoms such as abdominal pain, jaundice and vomiting, and by then it has often spread to other organs such as the liver.

Gallbladder cancer is thought to be related to the formation of gallstones, which may lead to calcification of the gallbladder, a condition known as porcelain gallbladder. Porcelain gallbladder is also rare. Some studies indicate that people with porcelain gallbladder have a high risk of developing gallbladder cancer, but other studies question this. The outlook is poor for recovery if the cancer is found after symptoms have started to occur, with a five-year survival rate of close to 3%.

== Signs and symptoms ==
- Steady pain in the upper right abdomen
- Indigestion (dyspepsia)
- Bilious vomit
- Weakness
- Loss of appetite
- Weight loss
- Jaundice and vomiting due to obstruction

Early symptoms mimic gallbladder inflammation due to gallstones. Later, the symptoms may be that of biliary and stomach obstruction.

Of note, Courvoisier's law states that in the presence of a palpably enlarged gallbladder which is nontender and accompanied with mild painless jaundice, the cause is unlikely to be gallstones. This implicates possible malignancy of the gallbladder or pancreas, and the swelling is unlikely due to gallstones due to the chronic inflammation associated with gallstones leading to a shrunken, non-distensible gallbladder. However, the original observations of Ludwig Georg Courvoisier, published in Germany in 1890, were not originally cited as a law, and no mention of malignancy or pain (tenderness) was made. These points are commonly misquoted or confused in the medical literature.

== Risk factors ==
- Biological sex — it's twice as common in females as in males
- Age — it presents commonly in seventh and eighth decades
- Obesity
- Chronic cholecystitis and cholelithiasis
- Primary sclerosing cholangitis
- Chronic typhoid infection of gallbladder; chronic Salmonella typhi carriers have three to 200 times higher risk of gallbladder cancer than non-carriers and 1–6% lifetime risk of development of cancer
- Various single nucleotide polymorphisms (SNPs) have been shown to be associated with gallbladder cancer; however, existing genetic studies in GBC susceptibility have so far been insufficient to confirm any association
- Gallbladder polyps
- Calcified gallbladder wall (porcelain gallbladder)
- Congenital abnormalities of the bile duct such as choledochal cyst

According to the recent systematic review, gallbladder cancer risk is strongly associated with higher body mass index, obesity, overweight, waist circumference, waist-to-height ratio, high parity, and bile duct infection. Meanwhile, the links to tobacco smoking, alcohol consumption, and insufficient physical activity are significant but considered less credible.

== Diagnosis ==
Early diagnosis is not generally possible. People at high risk, such as women or Native Americans with gallstones, are evaluated closely. Transabdominal ultrasound, CT scan, endoscopic ultrasound, MRI, and MR cholangio-pancreatography (MRCP) may be used for diagnosis. A large number of gallbladder cancers are found incidentally in patients being evaluated for cholelithiasis or gallstone formation, which is far more common. No effective population screening method exists for gallbladder cancer, and early-stage disease typically presents without symptoms. According to the American Cancer Society, only approximately 20% (1 in 5) of gallbladder cancers are detected while still localized to the gallbladder. A biopsy is the only certain way to tell whether or not the tumorous growth is malignant.

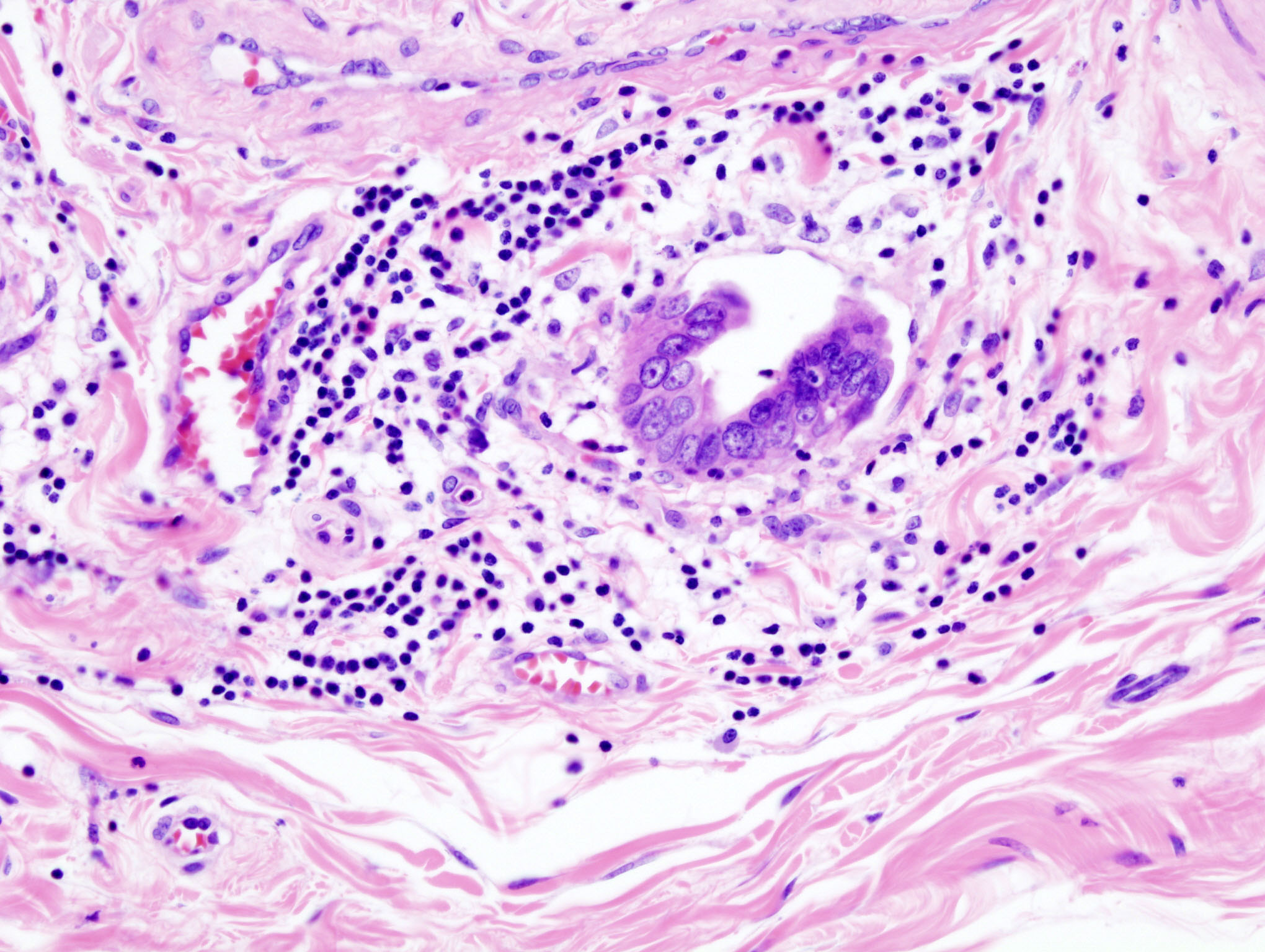
Gallbladder adenocarcinoma lymphatic invasion histopathology

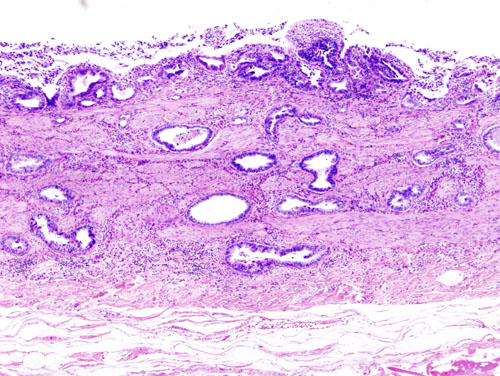
Incidentally discovered gallbladder cancer (adenocarcinoma) following a cholecystectomy.

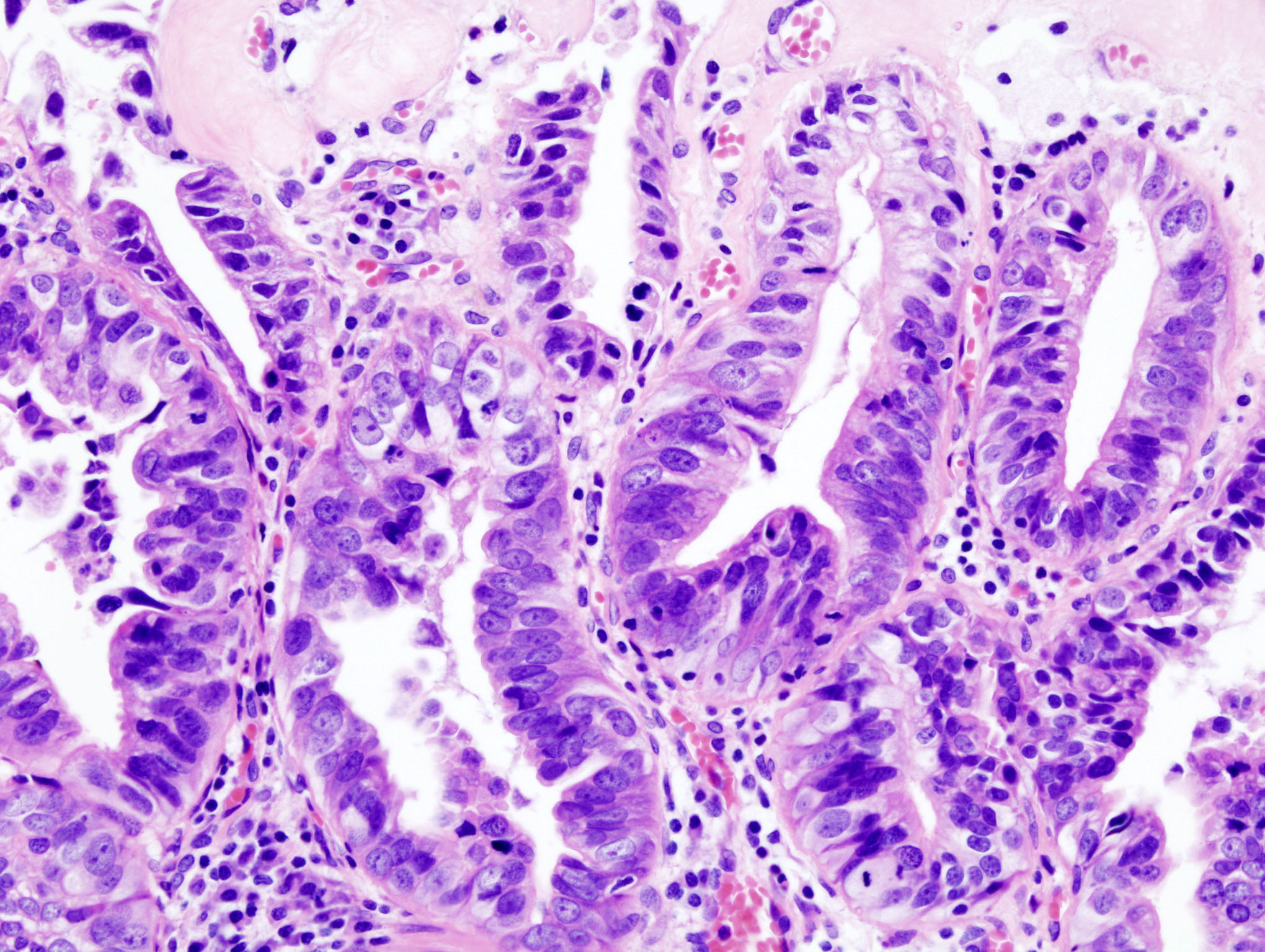
Gallbladder adenocarcinoma histopathology

=== Differential diagnosis ===
Xanthogranulomatous cholecystitis (XGC) is a rare form of gallbladder disease which mimics gallbladder cancer although it is not cancerous. It was first discovered and reported in the medical literature in 1976 by J.J. McCoy Jr., and colleagues.

== Treatment ==
If the cancer is detected early, in a stage before has spread, it may be treatable by surgery. Gallbladder cancer surgery is called radical cholecystectomy or extended cholecystectomy and involves the removal of the gallbladder along with adequate removal of its liver bed to the healthy tissue. The lymph nodes in the vicinity of the cancer may also be removed. Sometimes removal of a large part of the liver called an hepatectomy is required to completely remove the tumor. The bile duct may also need to be removed. However, with gallbladder cancer's poor prognosis, most patients die within a year of surgery. If surgery is not possible, endoscopic stenting or percutaneous transhepatic biliary drainage (PTBD) of the biliary tree may reduce jaundice, and a stent in the stomach may relieve vomiting. Chemotherapy and radiation may also be used with surgery. For cancers that are unresectable, locally advanced, recurrent, or metastatic, including gallbladder carcinoma, gemcitabine plus cisplatin has traditionally been the standard chemotherapy regimen. However, since 2022-2023, immune checkpoint inhibitors have been integrated into first-line systemic treatment options. The FDA approved durvalumab combined with gemcitabine and cisplatin in 2022 and pembrolizumab with gemcitabine and cisplatin in 2023. They are useful for the locally advanced or metastatic biliary tract cancer, enhancing the effectiveness of treatment regimens (These approvals apply broadly to biliary tract cancer (BTC) rather than being specific to gallbladder carcinoma alone. The FDA's approval of pembrolizumab demonstrated a median overall survival of 12.7 months compared to 10.9 months with placebo plus chemotherapy in the KEYNOTE- 966 trial, indicating a notable improvement in patient outcomes). If gallbladder cancer is diagnosed after cholecystectomy for stone disease (incidental cancer), re-operation to remove part of liver and lymph nodes is required in most cases. When it is done as early as possible, patients have the best chance of long-term survival and even cure.

== Epidemiology ==
Gallbladder cancer depends significantly on geography, with GLOBOCAN 2022 estimating 122,469 new cases and 89,045 deaths globally in 2022, corresponding to age-standardized incidence and mortality rates of 1.2 and 0.83 per 100,000, respectively. The incidence is particularly high in South Central Asia and Eastern Asia, as well as certain regions of South America, where age-standardized rates are notably elevated.

American Cancer Society in the United States projected 12,640 new cases and 4,590 deaths in 2026 for cancers involving the gallbladder and large bile ducts, with approximately 40% of these cases expected to be gallbladder cancers specifically.

== Prognosis ==
Extent of disease at diagnosis significantly impacts prognosis, with the American Cancer Society reporting 5-year relative survival rates of 67% for localized disease, 29% for regional disease, and 4% for distant disease in the United States, based on SEER data from 2015 to 2021.

== Research ==
A better understanding of the biology of biliary tract cancers, including gallbladder cancer, is being achieved by advances in genomic profiling. This research is providing insight into deficiencies in the tumor cell's ability to accurately repair damages in their own DNA. The tumors in about 25% of patients with biliary tract cancer have some form of DNA damage repair deficiency. Knowledge of such deficiencies can be exploited to potentially increase response to treatment strategies that are currently available such as chemotherapy, radiotherapy, or immunotherapy. In advanced biliary tract cancers, precision oncology approaches are becoming more prevalent. In 2024, the FDA granted accelerated approval to zanidatamab-h rii for previously treated, unresectable or metastatic HER2-positive biliary tract cancer, based on the HERIZON-BTC-01 trial, which showed an objective response rate of 52% and a median duration of response of 14.9 months. The FDA also granted tumor-agnostic accelerated approval in 2024 to fam-trastuzumab deruxtecan-nxki for previously treated unresectable or metastatic HER2-positive solid tumors with no satisfactory alternative treatment options.
