= Colic =

Pain due to bodily tubes contracting to force an obstruction out

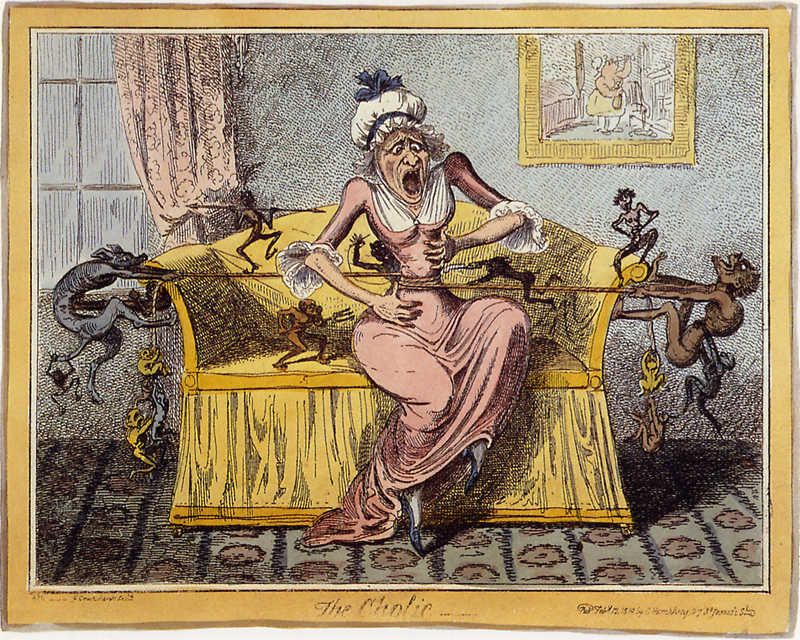
- The cholic (1819) George Cruikshank
- Pronunciation: /ˈkɒl.ɪk/, KOL-ik
- Specialty: Gastroenterology, Urology

Colic or cholic (/ˈkɒlɪk/) is a form of pain that starts and stops abruptly. Colic pain is usually caused by the obstruction of a smooth muscle passageway in the body (e.g. the small or large intestine, bile duct, or ureter). The obstruction triggers muscular contractions (peristalsis) to force the blockage out of the organ, resulting in episodic pain that fluctuates with the contractions. Although the term primarily refers to pain caused by this mechanism, any pain which occurs in episodes or fluctuates in intensity may be termed colic or colicky pain.

Colic episodes can cause extreme pain, nausea, sweating, and vomiting. The blockage of important passageways in the body can lead to severe and potentially fatal complications if not cleared, such as cholecystitis in the case of biliary colic, or in kidney stone disease. Although the action of peristalsis can sometimes clear such blockages without medical intervention, surgery or other medical therapies designed to remove the obstruction may be necessary for treatment of the condition.

== Terminology ==
The term is from Ancient Greek κολικός (kolikos) 'relative to the colon' and was first used in the sense of an acute, episodic abdominal pain in the Promptorium Parvulorum, completed sometime around 1440. In the modern day, the term is more often used to refer to baby colic, a condition in infants of excessive crying which typically does not have an organic cause. The usage of the term colic in this latter sense became prevalent by the mid-20th century in pediatric journals.

== Examples ==
- Baby colic, excess infant crying of unknown cause
- Biliary colic, blockage by a gallstone of the common bile duct or cystic duct
- Devon colic or painter's colic, a condition caused by lead poisoning
- Horse colic, a potentially fatal condition experienced by horses, caused by intestinal displacement or blockage
- Renal colic, a pain in the flank, characteristic of kidney stones
