= Lisha Savage =

Lisha Savage (born June 23, 1986 in Berlin) is a German web video producer, influencer, author, and reality TV participant.

== Biography ==
Lisha Savage has Turkish-Portuguese roots and grew up in Berlin. She exhibited fits of rage and violent outbursts, was involved in fights, and received a ten-month suspended sentence. Since 2010, she has been in a relationship with her later husband Lou. In 2014, they launched the YouTube channel Lisha&Lou, where they share content about music, fitness, beauty, and fashion. Since their wedding in December 2018, the couple has lived in Mallorca. In early 2023, Lisha spoke about her eating disorder, which led to significant weight loss and a gallbladder attack.

== Career ==
Lisha Savage had her breakthrough in reality TV in 2020 with her participation in the RTL show Das Sommerhaus der Stars together with Lou. In the following years, she appeared in other shows such as Das große Promi-Büßen (2022) and Promis unter Palmen (2025).

Lisha and Lou Savage published the Spiegel bestseller Total paranormal! in 2021.

== Filmography ==
- 2020: Das Sommerhaus der Stars (RTL)
- 2021: Die Festspiele der Reality Stars – Wer ist die hellste Kerze? (Sat.1)
- 2021: Die Tutorial-Champions – Promipaare machen’s nach (Sat.1)
- 2022: Das perfekte Promi-Dinner (Vox)
- 2022: Mein Mann kann (Sat.1)
- 2023: Das große Promi-Büßen (ProSieben)
- 2024: Reality Backpackers (ProSieben)
- 2025: Promis unter Palmen (Sat.1)

== Discography ==
=== Singles ===
- 2023: Lass Los
- 2023: Tränen
- 2024: Flieh mit mir (feat. Lou)
