= Sonographic Murphy sign =

- Purpose: determine cholecystitis

A sonographic Murphy sign is a finding when performing diagnostic medical sonography. It is different from the Murphy sign found on physical examination, but both signs are associated with cholecystitis When the sonographer presses directly over the gallbladder, and the patient expresses pain, more than when the sonographer presses anywhere else, this is said to be a positive sonographic Murphy sign.

== Differences ==
A Sonographic Murphy sign is different from a Murphy sign on physical examination of the abdomen in three ways:

1. Unlike the physician doing an abdominal exam, the sonographer can see the exact position of the gallbladder, which varies somewhat from one person to the next, and with the depth of inspiration.
2. The patient usually takes a breath and holds it during scanning, while the traditional Murphy sign is elicited while the patient is inhaling, and
3. The sonographer is usually asking the patient about the pain, while the traditional Murphy sign relies on an involuntary reaction - stopping inspiration when the gallbladder slides under the examining hand.
