= William C. MacCarty =

American surgeon and pathologist

- Born: June 10, 1880; Louisville, Kentucky, U.S.
- Died: May 17, 1964 (aged 83); Rochester, Minnesota, U.S.
- Education: University of Kentucky; Johns Hopkins University
- Children: 2

William Carpenter MacCarty (June 10, 1880 – May 17, 1964) was an American surgeon and pathologist active in the early 20th century.

== Early life and education ==
MacCarty was born in Louisville, Kentucky on June 10, 1880, to Rhoda Ann Carpenter MacCarty and William Orlando MacCarty.

He attended the University of Kentucky for his B.S. in 1900 and M.S. in 1909. He earned his medical degree from Johns Hopkins University in 1904. Following his graduation from Johns Hopkins, he studied at the Koenigin Hospital in Berlin until 1906, focusing on surgical pathology.

== Career ==
He became head of the Surgical Pathology Section of the Mayo Clinic in 1909, continuing in the role until 1946, and serving a senior consultant until 1948.

He introduced the term strawberry gallbladder in 1910. His article contains one of the earliest color photographs of pathology specimens. Known for his claim that "a well trained pathologist can make the diagnosis of cancer from a single cell" in the frozen section practice, he earned the nickname "One Cell MacCarty". He was a founding member of the American Society for Clinical Pathology in 1922.

He taught pathology as a professor in the University of Minnesota's Mayo Graduate School of Medicine.

He retired on October 1, 1948.

== Personal life and death ==
MacCarty married Helen Maud Collin, and the couple had two sons, both of whom entered the medical field. William C. MacCarty Jr. (1911–1988) worked as a radiologist, while Collin S. MacCarty led the Neurologic Surgery section of the Mayo Clinic.

MacCarty died in Rochester, Minnesota on May 17, 1964, following a brief illness.

== Selected publications ==
MacCarty wrote over 100 papers during his career, and also wrote "for a number of medical books and encyclopedias".

=== Articles ===
- MacCarty, William Carpenter; Blackford, John Minor (June 1912). "Involvement of Regional Lymphatic Glands in Carcinoma of the Stomach". Annals of Surgery. 55 (6): 811–843. doi:10.1097/00000658-191206000-00004. ISSN 0003-4932. PMC 1407284. PMID 17862847.
- MacCARTY, William Carpenter (1922-12-02). "Does Cancer Arise in Chronic Gastric Ulcer?". JAMA: The Journal of the American Medical Association. 79 (23): 1928. doi:10.1001/jama.1922.02640230038011. ISSN 0098-7484.
- MacCarty, William Carpenter (1931-01-01). "The Present Status of Knowledge of Cancer*". American Journal of Clinical Pathology. 1 (1): 85–92. doi:10.1093/ajcp/1.1.85. ISSN 0002-9173.
- MacCarty, William Carpenter (1938-09-01). "Early cancer of the stomach and its clinical significance". The American Journal of Digestive Diseases. 5 (9): 549–554. doi:10.1007/BF02996472. ISSN 1573-2568.

== Honors and awards ==
- Honorary Doctorate of Science (1937), University of Kentucky
