= Biliary colic =

Medical condition in which gallstones cause acute pain

- Other names: Gallstone attack, gallbladder attack
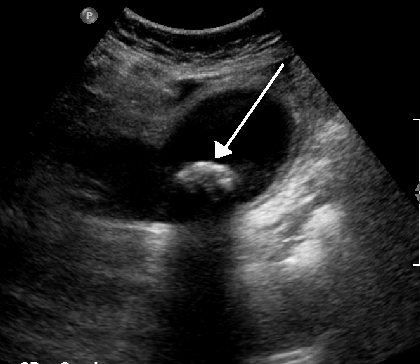
- Biliary colic is often related to a stone in the gallbladder
- Specialty: Gastroenterology

Biliary colic, also known as symptomatic cholelithiasis, a gallbladder attack or gallstone attack, is when a colic (sudden pain) occurs due to a gallstone temporarily blocking the cystic duct. Typically, the pain is in the right upper part of the abdomen, and can be severe. Pain usually lasts from 15 minutes to a few hours. Often, it occurs after eating a heavy meal, or during the night. Repeated attacks are common. Cholecystokinin – a gastrointestinal hormone – plays a role in the colic, as following the consumption of fatty meals, the hormone triggers the gallbladder to contract, which may expel stones into the duct and temporarily block it until being successfully passed.

Gallstone formation occurs from the precipitation of crystals that aggregate to form stones. The most common form is cholesterol gallstones. Other forms include calcium, bilirubin, pigment, and mixed gallstones. Other conditions that produce similar symptoms include appendicitis, stomach ulcers, pancreatitis, and gastroesophageal reflux disease.

Treatment for gallbladder attacks is typically surgery to remove the gallbladder. This can be either done through small incisions or through a single larger incision. Open surgery through a larger incision is associated with more complications than surgery through small incisions. Surgery is typically done under general anesthesia. In those who are unable to have surgery, medication to try to dissolve the stones or shock wave lithotripsy may be tried. As of 2017, it is not clear whether surgery is indicated for everyone with biliary colic.

In the developed world, 10 to 15% of adults have gallstones. Of those with gallstones, biliary colic occurs in 1 to 4% each year. Nearly 30% of people have further problems related to gallstones in the year following an attack. About 15% of people with biliary colic eventually develop inflammation of the gallbladder if not treated. Other complications include inflammation of the pancreas.

== Signs and symptoms ==
Pain is the most common presenting symptom. It is usually described as sharp, crampy, dull or severe right upper quadrant pain, which may radiate to the right shoulder, or less commonly, behind the breastbone. Nausea and vomiting can be associated with biliary colic. Individuals may also present with pain that is induced following a fatty meal and the symptom of indigestion. The pain often lasts longer than 30 minutes, up to a few hours. The pain caused by biliary colic can become so extreme that sufferers may admit themselves to emergency rooms and hospitals to seek treatment. In general, the pain subsides once the gallstone is successfully passed, but soreness may persist for around 24 hours after the worst of the pain passes.

Biliary colic can be distinguished from other digestive conditions with similar symptoms, such as indigestion, gastric reflux or heartburn, in that the pain caused by biliary colic is not relieved by vomiting, bowel movements or flatulence. The pain is also not affected by changes in posture or antacid medicine. Episodes of biliary colic are generally intermittent, and sufferers may experience several weeks or months without an attack before experiencing it again.

Patients usually have normal vital signs with biliary colic, whereas patients with cholecystitis are usually febrile and more ill appearing. Lab studies that should be ordered include a complete blood count, liver function tests and lipase. In biliary colic, lab findings are usually within normal limits. Alanine aminotransferase and aspartate transaminase are usually suggestive of liver disease whereas elevation of bilirubin and alkaline phosphatase suggests common bile duct obstruction. Pancreatitis should be considered if the lipase value is elevated; gallstone disease is the major cause of pancreatitis.

=== Complications ===
The presence of gallstones can lead to inflammation of the gallbladder (cholecystitis) or the biliary tree (cholangitis) or acute inflammation of the pancreas (pancreatitis). Rarely, a gallstone can become impacted in the ileocecal valve that joins the caecum and the ileum, causing gallstone ileus (mechanical ileus).

Complications from delayed surgery include pancreatitis, empyema, and perforation of the gallbladder, cholecystitis, cholangitis, and obstructive jaundice.

Biliary pain in the absence of gallstones, known as postcholecystectomy syndrome, may severely affect the patient's quality of life, even in the absence of disease progression.

== Causes ==
Biliary pain is most frequently caused by obstruction of the common bile duct or the cystic duct by a gallstone. However, the presence of gallstones is a frequent incidental finding and does not always necessitate treatment, in the absence of identifiable disease. Furthermore, biliary pain may be associated with functional disorders of the biliary tract, so-called acalculous biliary pain (pain without stones), and can even be found in patients post-cholecystectomy (removal of the gallbladder), possibly as a consequence of dysfunction of the biliary tree and the sphincter of Oddi. Acute episodes of biliary pain may be induced or exacerbated by certain foods, most commonly those high in fat.

== Risk factors ==
Cholesterol gallstone formation risk factors include age, female sex, family history, race, pregnancy, parity, obesity, hormonal birth control, diabetes mellitus, cirrhosis, prolonged fasting, rapid weight loss, total parenteral nutrition, ileal disease and impaired gallbladder emptying.

Patients that have gallstones and biliary colic are at increased risk for complications, including cholecystitis. Complications from gallstone disease is 0.3% per year and therefore prophylactic cholecystectomy are rarely indicated unless part of a special population that includes porcelain gallbladder, individuals eligible for organ transplant, diabetics and those with sickle cell anemia.

== Diagnosis ==
Diagnosis is guided by the person's presenting symptoms and laboratory findings. The gold standard imaging modality for the presence of gallstones is ultrasound of the right upper quadrant. There are many reasons for this choice, including no exposure to radiation, low cost, and availability in city, urban, and rural hospitals. Gallstones are detected with a specificity and sensitivity of greater than 95% with ultrasound. Further signs on ultrasound may suggest cholecystitis or choledocholithiasis. Computed Tomography (CT) is not indicated when investigating for gallbladder disease as 60% of stones are not radiopaque. CT should only be utilized if other intra-abdominal pathology exists or the diagnosis is uncertain. Endoscopic retrograde cholangiopancreatography (ERCP) should be used only if lab tests suggest the existence of a gallstone in the bile duct.

== Management ==
=== Medications ===
Initial management includes the relief of symptoms and correcting electrolyte and fluid imbalance that may occur with vomiting. Antiemetics, such as dimenhydrinate, are used to treat the nausea. Pain may be treated with anti-inflammatories, particularly NSAIDs such as ibuprofen, ketorolac or diclofenac. Opioids, such as morphine, less commonly may be used. NSAIDs are more or less equivalent to opioids. Hyoscine butylbromide, an antispasmodic, is also indicated in biliary colic.

In biliary colic, the risk of infection is minimal and therefore antibiotics are not required. Presence of infection indicates cholecystitis.

=== Surgery ===
It is unclear whether those experiencing a gallstone attack should receive surgical treatment or not. The scientific basis to assess whether surgery outperformed other treatment was insufficient and better studies were needed as of a SBU report in 2017. Treatment of biliary colic is dictated by the underlying cause. The presence of gallstones, usually visualized by ultrasound, generally necessitates a surgical treatment (removal of the gall bladder, typically via laparoscopy). Removal of the gallbladder with surgery, known as a cholecystectomy, is the definitive surgical treatment for biliary colic. A 2013 Cochrane review found tentative evidence to suggest that early gallbladder removal may be better than delayed removal. Early laparoscopic cholecystectomy happens within 72 hours of diagnosis. In a Cochrane review that evaluated receiving early versus delayed surgery, they found that 23% of those who waited on average 4 months ended up in hospital for complications, compared to none with early intervention with surgery. Early intervention has other advantages including a reduced number of visits to the emergency department, fewer conversions to open surgery, less operating time required, and reduced time in hospital postoperatively. The Swedish agency SBU estimated in 2017 that increasing acute phase surgeries could free multiple in-hospital days per patient and would additionally spare pain and suffering in wait of receiving an operation. The report found that those with acute inflammation of the gallbladder can be surgically treated in the acute phase, within a few days of symptom debut, without increasing the risk for complications (compared to when the surgery is done later in an asymptomatic stage).

== Epidemiology ==
The annual risk of developing biliary colic is 2 to 3%.
