= Hepatitis X =

- Other names: Non-A-E hepatitis
- Specialty: Hepatology

Non-A-E hepatitis, also known as hepatitis X, is an infectious disease of the liver referring to a case of viral hepatitis that cannot be attributed to hepatitis A, B, C, D, or E. The disease involves swelling and inflammation of the liver.

Symptoms of non-A-E hepatitis may include tiredness, nausea, vomiting, abdomen pain, and fever. The specific cause of non-A-E hepatitis is unknown. It is considered a rare disorder.
