= Hepatitis F virus =

Hypothetical virus

Hepatitis F is a hypothetical virus linked to viral hepatitis. Several hepatitis F candidates emerged in the 1990s; however, none of these claims were substantiated.

In 1994, Niren Deka et al. reported that novel viral particles had been discovered in the stool of post-transfusion, non-hepatitis A, non-hepatitis B, non-hepatitis C, non-hepatitis E patients. Injection of these particles into the bloodstream of Indian rhesus monkeys caused hepatitis, and the virus was named hepatitis F or Toga virus. Further investigations failed to confirm the existence of the virus, and it was delisted as a cause for infectious hepatitis.

A subsequently-discovered virus thought to cause hepatitis was named Hepatitis G, though its role in hepatitis has not been confirmed and it is now considered synonymous with GB virus C. It is an "orphan virus" with no causal links to any human disease.
