= Xanthogranulomatous inflammation =

- Other names: Xanthogranulomatous inflammation

The xanthogranulomatous process (XP), is a form of acute and chronic inflammation characterized by an exuberant clustering of foamy macrophages among other inflammatory cells. Localization in the kidney and renal pelvis has been the most frequent and better known occurrence followed by that in the gallbladder but many others have been subsequently recorded. The pathological findings of the process and etiopathogenetic and clinical observations have been reviewed by Cozzutto and Carbone.

== Location ==
The xanthogranulomatous type of inflammation is most-commonly seen in pyelonephritis and cholecystitis, although it has more recently been described in an array of other locations including bronchi, lung, endometrium, vagina, fallopian tubes, ovary, testis, epididymis, stomach, colon, ileum, pancreas, bone, lymph nodes, bladder, adrenal gland, abdomen and muscle. Telling apart clinically a XP from a tumor condition can be challenging as pointed out by several authors. Cozzutto and Carbone suggested that a wide array of entities characterized by a large content of histiocytes and foamy macrophages could be traced back at least in part to a xanthogranulomatous inflammation. These include such varied disturbances as xanthoma disseminatum, ceroid granuloma of the gallbladder, Whipple's disease, inflammatory pseudotumor of the lung, plasma cell granuloma of the lung, malakoplakia, verruciform xanthoma, foamy histiocytosis of the spleen in thrombocytopenic purpura, isolated xanthoma of the small bowel, xanthofibroma of bone, and gastric xanthelasma.

A pathogenetic model might be suggested as follows:

1. suppuration, hemorrhage and necrosis,
2. granulomatous tissue with granular histiocytes and foamy macrophages,
3. fibrohistiocytoma-like or plasma cell granuloma-like patterns,
4. possible myofibroblast metaplasia.

A reactive fibrohistiocytic lesion simulating fibrous histiocytoma has been reported by Snover et al. Reactive granular cells in sites of trauma have been regarded of histiocytic nature. Sinus histiocytosis with massive lymphadenopathy (Rosai-Dorfman disease) might share several aspects of the XP. Likewise there might be some superimpositions between the XP and the plasma cell granuloma/histiocytoma-inflammatory myofibroblastic tumor complex. The XP might be an important stage of this complex.

== Histology ==
Under microscope, the cellular infiltrate includes neutrophils, lymphocytes, plasma cells, erythrocytes, hemosiderin-laden macrophages and prevalent foamy histiocytes. The latter are interspersed among other cells but often they cluster in a compacted mosaic-like pattern. The large lipid-laden macrophages display an eosinophilic or clear cytoplasm with a granular and vacuolated quality but can also have a spindle shape. Foreign body-type and Touton-type giant cells, calcospherites, cholesterol clefts and hemosiderin deposits are additional findings.

Hemorrhage, suppuration and necrosis are therefore the initial conditions leading to the xanthogranulomatous response. Plasma cells and fibrosis increase in later stages with the former being numerous and prominent. Proteus and Escherichia coli are the most commonly involved bacteria in xanthogranulomatous pyelonephritis. The foam cells of monocyte/macrophage origin are positive for KP1, HAM56, CD11b and CD68 as pointed out by Nakashiro et al. in xanthogranulomatous cholecystitis). Many T lymphocytes were identified by these authors positive to CD4 and CD8. Macrophages and T lymphocytes demonstrated a marked expression of HLA-DR antigen. A delayed type hypersensitivity reaction of cell mediated immunity has been suggested in the pathogenesis of xanthogranulomatous cholecystitis.

Destructive tumor-like masses with variable extension into adjacent fat and connective tissue can occur in cases involving organs such as kidney and gallbladder.

== See also ==
- Xanthogranulomatous osteomyelitis
