= Xanthogranulomatous osteomyelitis =

- Other names: XO
- Specialty: Infectious disease, orthopedic

Xanthogranulomatous osteomyelitis is a peculiar aspect of osteomyelitis characterized by prevalent histiocytic infiltrate and foamy macrophage clustering.

== Pathology ==
The granulomatous tissue largely comprises foam cells of monocyte/macrophage origin positive for KP1, HAM56, CD11b and CD68. Neutrophils, hemorrhagic foci and numerous plasma cells are additional findings. Staphylococcus aureus was isolated in the case reported by Kamat et al. A delayed type hypersensitivity reaction in cell-mediated immunity has been suggested in this type of infiltrate that is composed of macrophages and T cells. T cells are represented by a mixture of CD4+ and CD8+ lymphocytes. Macrophages and lymphocytes show marked expression of HLA-DR antigen. Arguably XO is the bone localization of the xanthogranulomatous process occurring in several other locations.

== Diagnosis ==
As of 2011 five cases had been reported, involving rib, tibial epiphysis, ulna, distal tibia and femur. Young individuals are prevalently affected but one case involved a 50-year-old woman. Pain, swelling of possibly long duration, fever and increased ESR are some of the main clinical findings. X-ray examination shows lytic foci with sclerotic margins.

== Management ==
Antibiotics have been used with success for cases with positive cultures, Curettage, bone grafting, and resection has been described in few studies.
