= Porcelain gallbladder =

- Other names: Calcified gallbladder
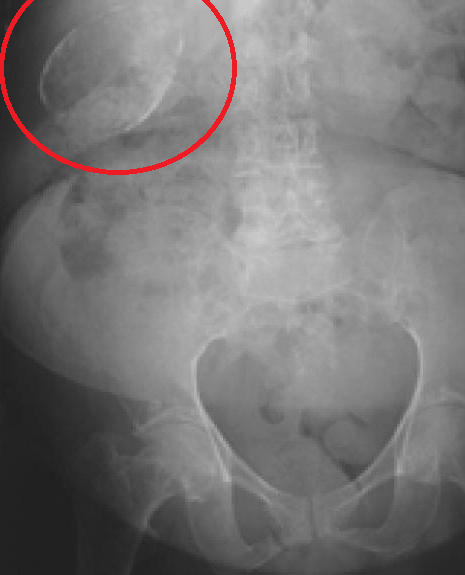
- Porcelain gallbladder on X-ray
- Specialty: Gastroenterology, hepatology

Porcelain gallbladder is a calcification of the gallbladder believed to be brought on by excessive gallstones, although the exact cause is not clear. As with gallstone disease in general, this condition occurs mostly in overweight female patients of middle age. It is a morphological variant of chronic cholecystitis. Inflammatory scarring of the wall, combined with dystrophic calcification within the wall transforms the gallbladder into a porcelain-like vessel. Removal of the gallbladder (cholecystectomy) is the recommended treatment.

== Symptoms and signs ==
Symptoms are similar to gallstones and can include abdominal pain (especially after eating), jaundice, and vomiting. Porcelain gallbladder can also be asymptomatic and discovered on imaging obtained for a different reason.

=== Association with cancer ===
The assertion that porcelain gallbladder increases the incidence of gallbladder cancer is widely taught in medical schools but is based on studies from 1931 and 1962. A prominent study aid for surgical residents even states that the risk of cancer in a porcelain gallbladder is 15%. The precise nature of the association between gallbladder cancer and porcelain gallbladder is uncertain. Two articles published in 2001 examined the association between cancer of the gallbladder and calcified gallbladder. The first study reviewed 10,741 cholecystectomies and found that the 88 patients with gallbladder cancer did not have calcified gallbladders while the 15 patients with porcelain gallbladders did not have gallbladder cancer. The second study reviewed 25,900 gallbladder specimens and found 150 patients with cancer and 44 patients with calcified gallbladders of two types (intramural calcification and selective mucosal calcification). The selective mucosal calcification group showed a 7% incidence of cancer with a significant odds ratio of 13.89.

An article published in 2013 reviewed 111 studies and found 340 patients with gallbladder wall calcification showed a 21% overall rate of gallbladder malignancy; however, when studies with obvious selection bias were excluded the rate of gallbladder malignancy fell to 6%. Comparatively, a matched cohort without gallbladder calcification showed a 1% rate of gallbladder malignancy.

In a systematic review of published clinical case reports, incomplete calcification showed higher frequency of malignancy compared with complete calcification and mortality was reported in 3 out of 54 cases, all with malignant disease .

== Diagnosis ==
Abdominal radiography (X-ray), abdominal ultrasound or CT scan.

== Treatment ==
Due to the increased risk for gallbladder cancer, the recommended treatment is cholecystectomy which usually includes pre-operative or intra-operative imaging of the biliary tree. Cholecystectomy may be performed via an open incision or via laparoscopic methods, but gallbladder anatomy and consistency may complicate the operation.

Based on evidence in the current literature, a prophylactic cholecystectomy is not routinely recommended for all patients with porcelain gallbladder and should be restricted to those with conventional indications, such as young patients.
