= Gallbladder polyp =

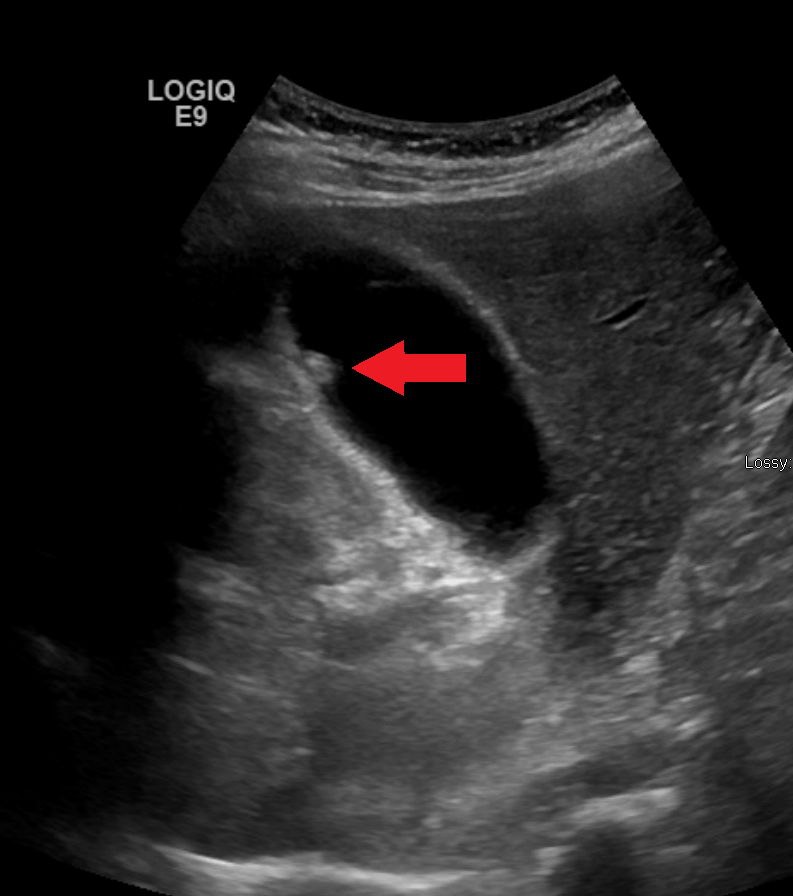
- A polyp in the gall bladder as seen on ultrasound

Gallbladder polyps are growths or lesions resembling growths (polypoid lesions) in the wall of the gallbladder. True polyps are abnormal accumulations of mucous membrane tissue that would normally be shed by the body.

== Signs and symptoms ==
Most polyps do not cause noticeable symptoms. Gallbladder polyps are usually found incidentally when examining the abdomen by ultrasound for other conditions, usually abdominal pain.

== Pathology ==
Most small polyps (less than 1 cm) are not cancerous and may remain unchanged for years. However, when small polyps occur with other conditions, such as primary sclerosing cholangitis, they are less likely to be benign. Larger polyps are more likely to develop into adenocarcinomas.

Cholesterolosis is characterized by an outgrowth of the mucosal lining of the gallbladder into fingerlike projections due to the excessive accumulation of cholesterol and triglycerides within macrophages in the epithelial lining. These cholesterol polyps account for most benign gallbladder polyps.

Adenomyomatosis describes a diseased state of the gallbladder in which the gallbladder wall is excessively thick, due to proliferation of subsurface cellular layer. It is characterized by deep folds into the muscularis propria. Ultrasonography may reveal the thickened gallbladder wall with intramural diverticulae, called Rokitansky-Aschoff sinuses.

== Diagnosis ==
Diagnosis is typically by ultrasound or CT imaging.

Upon histopathology of resected gallbladders, gallbladder polyps may be classified into the following main types:

- Non-neoplastic polyps: Cholesterol, hyperplastic, and inflammatory polyps, adenomyomas, leiomyomas, fibromas, and lipomas
- Neoplastic polyps: adenomas, adenocarcinomas, and squamous cell carcinomas
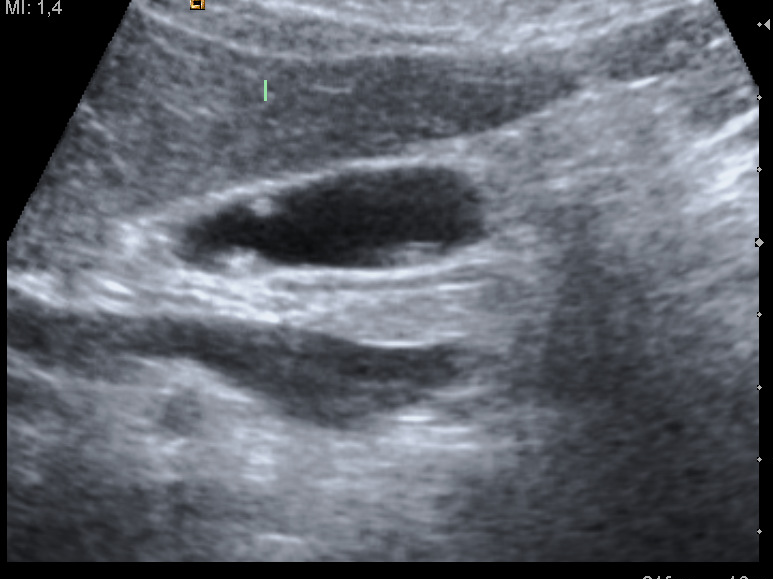
Ultrasound image of gallbladder polyps measuring 3–7 mm.

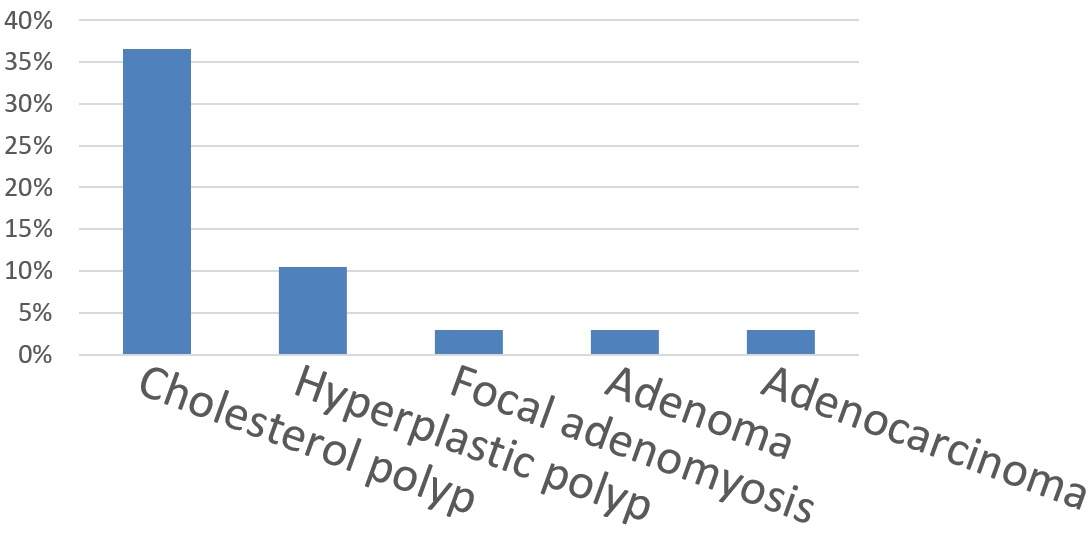
Gallbladder polyp types by relative incidence.

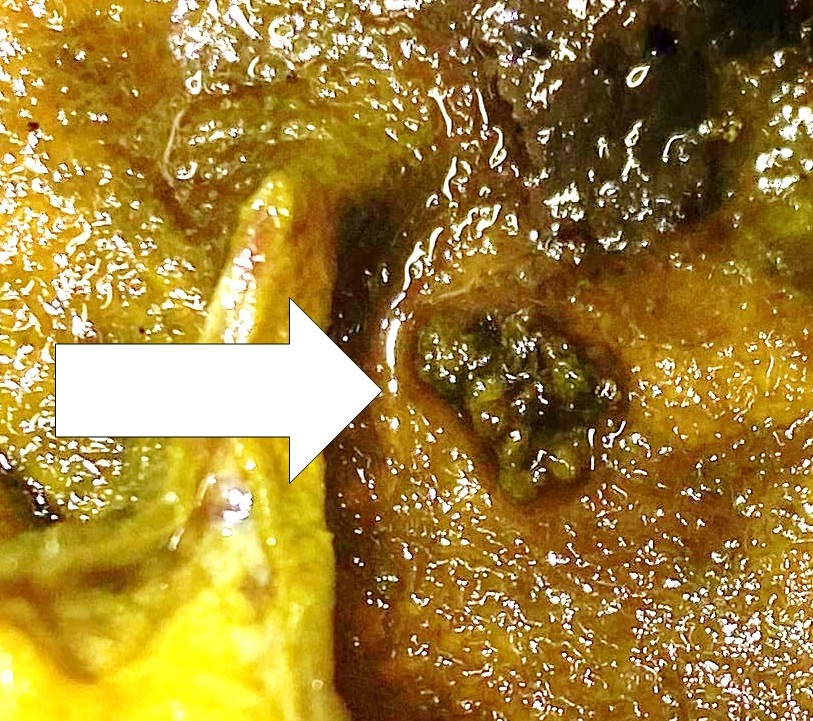
Photograph of a 6 mm large hyperplastic polyp of the gallbladder.

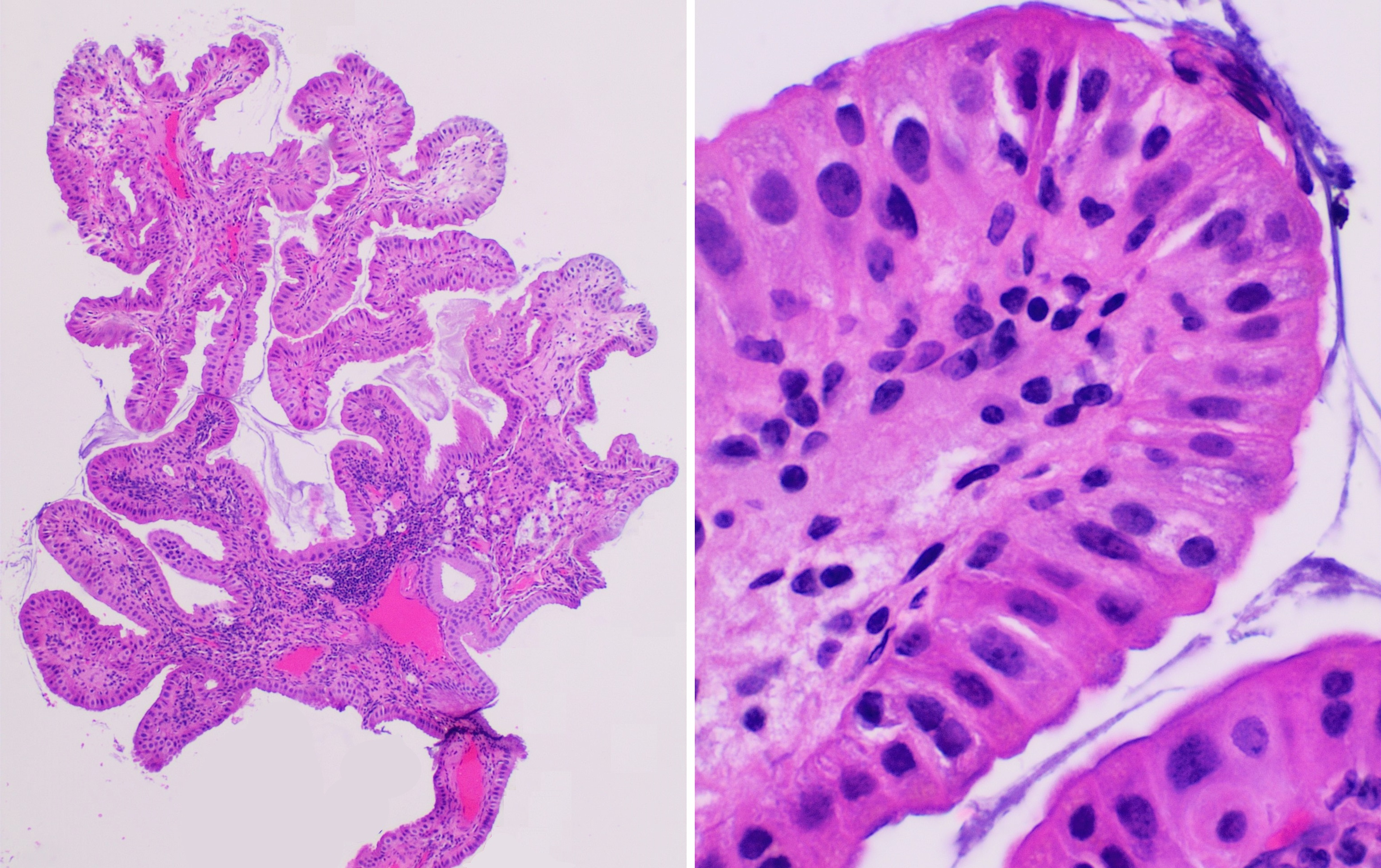
Histopathology of a hyperplastic polyp: There is no dysplasia.

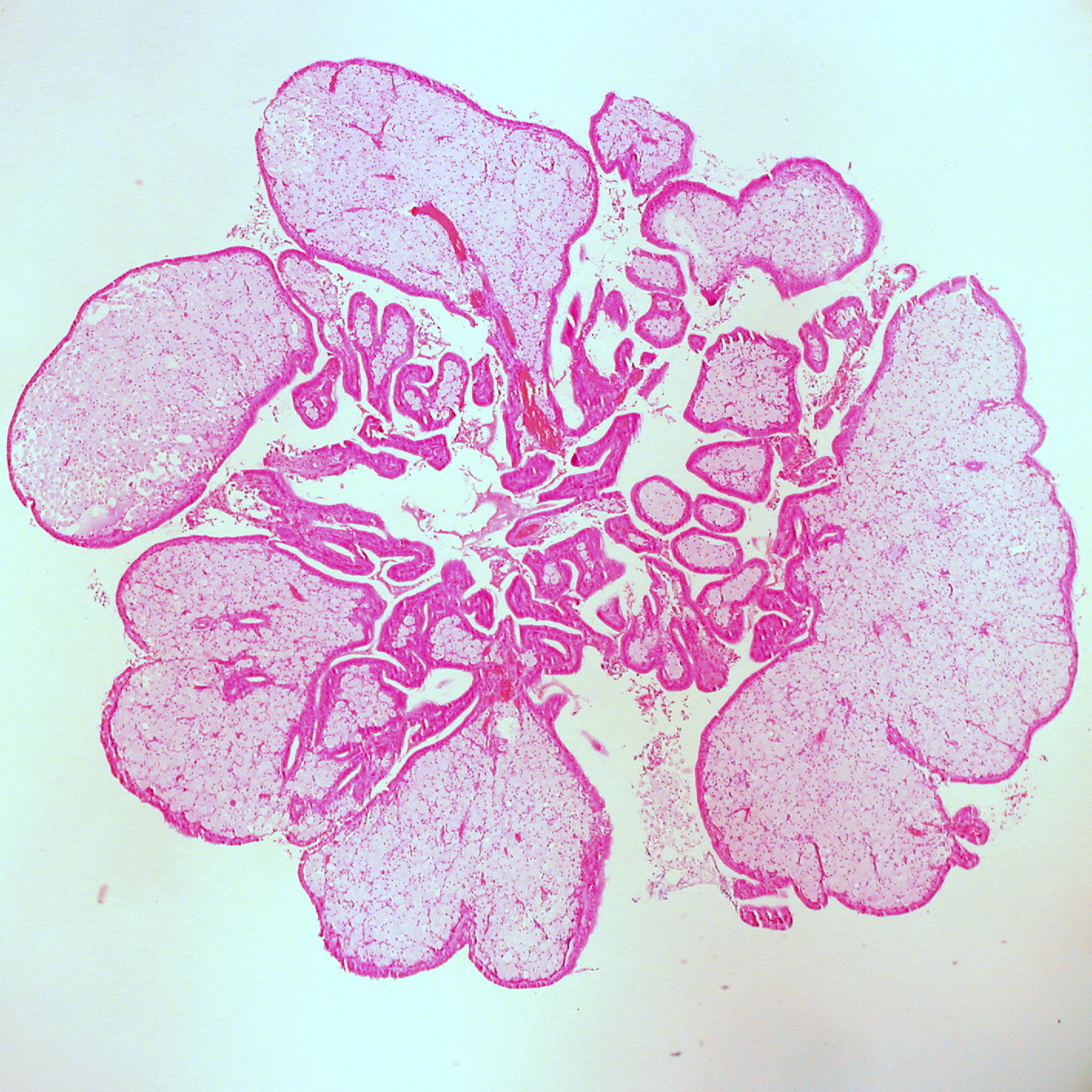
Cholesterol polyp, low magnification

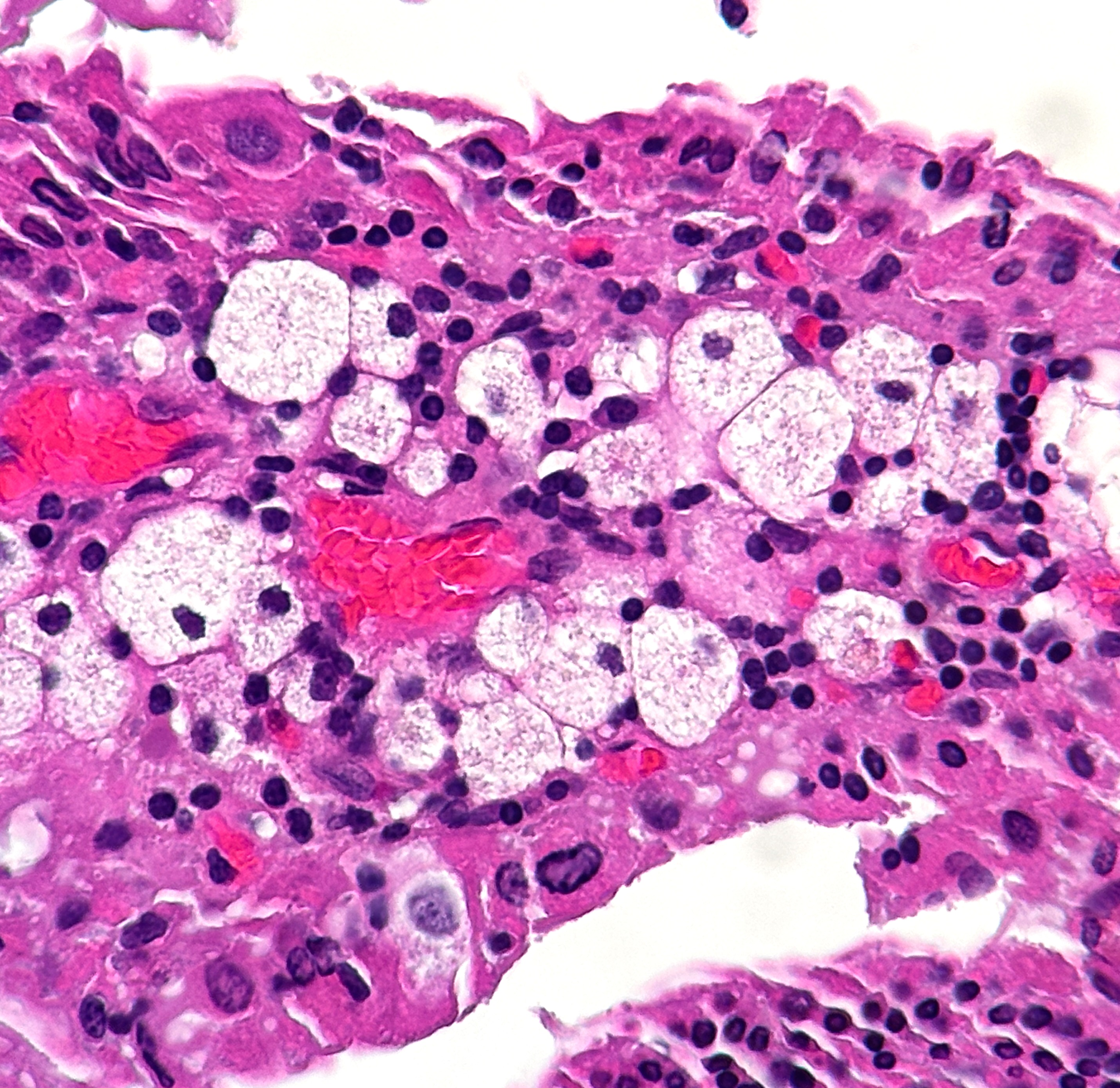
Cholesterol polyp, high magnification, showing papillary fronds with foamy macrophages. In this case, there is mild chronic cholecystitis, and subsequently the epithelial nuclei show reactive changes with mild enlargement and irregularity, but not to the degree of being dysplasia.

== Treatment ==
Most polyps are benign and do not need to be removed. Surgical removal of the gallbladder (cholecystectomy) is recommended when a gallbladder polyp larger than 1 cm is found, even if the person has no symptoms clearly related to the polyp. Laparoscopic surgery is an option for small or solitary polyps.

== Epidemiology ==
Polypoid lesions of the gallbladder affect approximately 5% of the adult population. The causes are uncertain, but there is a definite correlation with increasing age and the presence of gallstones (cholelithiasis). Most affected individuals do not have symptoms. The gallbladder polyps are detected during abdominal ultrasonography performed for other reasons.

The incidence of gallbladder polyps is higher among men than women. The overall prevalence among men of Chinese ancestry is 9.5%, higher than other ethnic types.
