= List of drugs: Z =

This multi-page article lists pharmaceutical drugs alphabetically by name. Many drugs have more than one name and, therefore, the same drug may be listed more than once. Brand names and generic names are differentiated by capitalizing brand names.

See also the list of the top 100 bestselling branded drugs, ranked by sales.

Abbreviations are used in the list as follows:

- INN = International nonproprietary name
- BAN = British Approved Name
- USAN = United States Adopted Name
- Two-letter codes for countries

Lists of drugs
1–9 | A | B | C | D | E | F | G | H | I | J | K | L | M | N | O | P | Q | R | S | T | U | V | W | X | Y | Z

== z ==
- Z-Pak

== za ==
- Zabdeno
- zabicipril (INN)
- zabiciprilat (INN)
- zabofloxacin (INN)
- zacopride (INN)
- Zactran
- Zadenvi
- Zaditen
- Zaditor
- Zafirlukast
- zafirlukast (INN)
- zafuleptine (INN)
- Zagam
- Zalasta
- zalcitabine (INN)
- zaldaride (INN)
- Zaleplon
- zaleplon (INN)
- zalospirone (INN)
- zaltidine (INN)
- zaltoprofen (INN)
- Zaltrap
- zalutumumab (INN)
- zamifenacin (INN)
- Zanaflex
- zanamivir (INN)
- zanidatamab (USAN, INN)
- zanidatamab-hrii
- zankiren (INN)
- zanolimumab (USAN)
- Zanosar
- zanoterone (INN)
- Zantac
- Zantac 25
- Zantac 75
- Zantac 150
- Zantac 300
- Zantac 360
- Zantac 75
- Zantac
- Zantryl
- Zanvastro
- zapizolam (INN)
- zaprinast (INN)
- Zapzyt Acne
- Zapzyt Acne Treatment
- Zapzyt Acne Wash Cleanser
- zardaverine (INN)
- Zarontin
- Zaroxolyn
- Zarxio
- Zarzio
- zatebradine (INN)
- zatosetron (INN)
- zaurategrast (INN)
- Zavesca
- Zavicefta
- Zavzpret
- Zaxopam
- Zaynich

== ze ==
- Zebeta
- Zebinix
- Zecuity
- Zefazone
- Zeffix
- Zegalogue
- Zegerid Otc
- Zegerid
- Zegfrovy
- Zejula
- Zelapar
- Zelboraf
- Zelnorm
- Zelsuvmi
- Zelvysia
- Zemaira
- Zembrace Symtouch
- Zemcelpro
- Zemdri
- Zemplar
- Zemuron
- Zenapax
- zenarestat (INN)
- Zenbexus
- Zenatane
- Zenavod
- Zenbexus
- zeniplatin (INN)
- zenocutuzumab (USAN, INN)
- zenocutuzumab-zbco
- Zenpep
- Zenrelia
- zepastine (INN)
- Zepatier
- Zepbound
- Zephiran
- Zephrex D
- Zephrex
- Zeposia
- Zepzelca
- zeranol (INN)
- Zerbaxa
- Zercepac
- Zerit XR
- Zerit
- Zerviate
- Zessly
- Zestoretic
- Zestril
- Zeta Clear
- Zetacet
- Zetar
- Zetia
- zetidoline (INN)
- Zetonna
- Zetran
- Zevalin
- Zevaskyn
- Zevtera

== zi ==
- Ziba-Rx
- Ziac
- Ziagen
- Ziana
- Ziba-Rx
- zibotentan (INN)
- zibrofusidic acid (INN)
- ziconotide (INN)
- zicronapine (INN)
- zidapamide (INN)
- Zide
- zidesamtinib (USAN, INN)
- zidometacin (INN)
- Zidovudine
- zidovudine (INN)
- Ziextenzo
- zifrosilone (INN)
- ziftomenib (INN)
- Ziihera
- Zilactin
- zilantel (INN)
- zilascorb (2 H) (INN)
- Zilbrysq
- Zileuton
- zileuton (INN)
- zilganersen (USAN, INN)
- zilpaterol (INN)
- Zilretta
- zilucoplan (INN)
- zilurgisertib (USAN, INN)
- zilurgisertib fumarate (USAN)
- zilurgisertib fumarate dihydrate
- Zilxi
- Zimbus Breezhaler
- zimelidine (INN)
- Zimhi
- zimidoben (INN)
- Zinacef
- zinapitant (INN)
- Zinbryta
- zinc chloride
- zinc sulfate
- Zincfrin
- Zincofax
- Zincon
- zindotrine (INN)
- zindoxifene (INN)
- Zinecard
- Zinforo
- Zingo
- zinoconazole (INN)
- zinostatin stimalamer (INN)
- zinostatin (INN)
- Zinplava
- zinterol (INN)
- zinviroxime (INN)
- Zioptan
- Zipan
- Zipan-25
- Zipan-50
- zipeprol (INN)
- ziprasidone (INN)
- Zipsor
- Zirabev
- ziralimumab (INN)
- Zirgan
- Zithromax
- Zituvimet XR
- Zituvimet
- Zituvio

== zm ==
- Zmax

== zo ==
- zocainone (INN)
- Zocor
- Zoely
- zofenopril (INN)
- zofenoprilat (INN)
- zoficonazole (INN)
- Zofran ODT
- Zofran Preservative Free
- Zofran
- Zohydro ER
- Zokinvy
- Zokovea
- Zoladex
- zolamine (INN)
- zolasartan (INN)
- zolazepam (INN)
- zolbetuximab (INN)
- zolbetuximab-clzb
- zoledronic acid (INN)
- Zoledronic
- zolenzepine (INN)
- zoleprodolol (INN)
- zolertine (INN)
- Zolgensma
- Zolicef
- zoliflodacin (INN)
- zolimidine (INN)
- zolimomab aritox (INN)
- Zolinza
- zoliprofen (INN)
- zolmitriptan (INN)
- Zoloft
- zoloperone (INN)
- zolpidem (INN)
- Zolpimist
- Zolsketil pegylated liposomal
- Zolyse
- Zomacton
- Zomarist
- zomebazam (INN)
- zomepirac (INN)
- Zometa
- Zomig Zmt
- Zomig
- Zonalon
- zonampanel (INN)
- Zonegran
- zongertinib (USAN, INN)
- zoniclezole (INN)
- zoniporide mesylate (USAN)
- Zonisade
- Zonisamide
- zonisamide (INN)
- Zontivity
- Zoonotic influenza vaccine Seqirus
- zopapogene imadenovec (USAN, INN)
- zopapogene imadenovec-drba
- zopiclone (INN)
- zopolrestat (INN)
- Zorbtive
- Zortress
- zorubicin (INN)
- Zorvolex
- Zoryve
- Zostavax
- Zostrix
- zosuquidar (USAN, INN)
- Zosyn
- zotarolimus (USAN)
- zotepine (INN)
- Zovia 1/35
- Zovia 1/35E-21
- Zovia 1/35E-28
- Zovia 1/50E-21
- Zovia 1/50E-28
- Zovia
- Zovirax
- zoxazolamine (INN)

== zt-zy ==
- Ztalmy
- Ztlido
- Zubsolv
- zucapsaicin (INN)
- zuclomifene (INN)
- zuclopenthixol (INN)
- Zulresso
- Zumandimine
- Zunveyl
- Zuplenz
- Zuragard Blue
- Zuragard Clear
- Zuragard
- Zurampic
- Zurnai
- Zurzuvae
- Zusduri
- Zutectra
- Zutripro
- Zvogra
- Zyban
- Zyclara
- Zycubo
- Zydelig
- Zydone
- Zyflo Cr
- Zyflo
- Zyfrel
- Zykadia
- Zylet
- Zyllt
- zylofuramine (INN)
- Zyloprim
- Zymar
- Zymaxid
- Zymfentra
- Zynlonta
- Zynrelef Kit
- Zynrelef
- Zynteglo
- Zynyz
- Zypadhera
- Zypitamag
- Zyprexa Relprevv
- Zyprexa Zydis
- Zyprexa
- Zyrtec Allergy
- Zyrtec Hives Relief
- Zyrtec-D 12 Hour
- Zyrtec-D
- Zyrtec
- Zytiga
- Zytram
- Zyvox
- Zyvoxam
