= Aritox =

The term aritox occurs in names of monoclonal antibodies and indicates that they are linked to an A chain of the ricin protein.

- Telimomab aritox
- Zolimomab aritox
