= HuMax =

HuMax is an abbreviation for "human monoclonal antibody targeting", used by the pharmaceutical company Genmab in trade names. Examples include:

- HuMax-CD4 (zanolimumab)
- HuMax-CD20 (ofatumumab)
- HuMax-EGFr (zalutumumab)
