= Futibatinib =

Chemical compound

Clinical data
- Pronunciation: /ˌfjuːtɪˈbætɪnɪb/ FYOO-ti-BA-ti-nib
- Trade names: Lytgobi
- Other names: TAS-120
- AHFS/Drugs.com: Micromedex Detailed Consumer Information
- License data: US DailyMed: Futibatinib
- Routes of administration: By mouth
- Drug class: Antineoplastic
- ATC code: L01EN04 (WHO)

Legal status
- Legal status: US: ℞-only; EU: Rx-only

Identifiers
- IUPAC name: 1-[(3S)-3-[4-amino-3-[2-(3,5-dimethoxyphenyl)ethynyl]pyrazolo[3,4-d]pyrimidin-1-yl]pyrrolidin-1-yl]prop-2-en-1-one
- CAS Number: 1448169-71-8
- PubChem CID: 71621331
- IUPHAR/BPS: 9786
- DrugBank: DB15149
- ChemSpider: 58877816
- UNII: 4B93MGE4AL
- KEGG: D11725
- ChEMBL: ChEMBL3701238
- PDB ligand: TZ0 (PDBe, RCSB PDB)

Chemical and physical data
- Formula: C_{22}H_{22}N_{6}O_{3}
- Molar mass: 418.457 g·mol^{−1}
- 3D model (JSmol): Interactive image
- SMILES: COC1=CC(=CC(OC)=C1)C#CC1=NN([C@H]2CCN(C2)C(=O)C=C)C2=C1C(N)=NC=N2
- InChI: InChI=1S/C22H22N6O3/c1-4-19(29)27-8-7-15(12-27)28-22-20(21(23)24-13-25-22)18(26-28)6-5-14-9-16(30-2)11-17(10-14)31-3/h4,9-11,13,15H,1,7-8,12H2,2-3H3,(H2,23,24,25)/t15-/m0/s1; Key:KEIPNCCJPRMIAX-HNNXBMFYSA-N

Futibatinib, sold under the brand name Lytgobi, is an anti-cancer medication used for the treatment of cholangiocarcinoma (bile duct cancer). It is a kinase inhibitor. It is taken by mouth.

Futibatinib was approved for medical use in the United States in September 2022, in Japan in June 2023 and in the European Union in July 2023.

== Medical uses ==
Futibatinib is indicated for the treatment of adults with previously treated, unresectable, locally advanced or metastatic intrahepatic cholangiocarcinoma harboring fibroblast growth factor receptor 2 (FGFR2) gene fusions or other rearrangements.

== Society and culture ==
=== Legal status ===
On 26 April 2023, the Committee for Medicinal Products for Human Use (CHMP) of the European Medicines Agency (EMA) adopted a positive opinion, recommending the granting of a conditional marketing authorization for the medicinal product Lytgobi, intended for the second-line treatment of locally advanced or metastatic cholangiocarcinoma characterized by fusion or rearrangements of fibroblast growth factor receptor (FGFR) 2. The applicant for this medicinal product is Taiho Pharma Netherlands B.V. Futibatinib was approved for medical use in the European Union in July 2023.

=== Names ===
Futibatinib is the international nonproprietary name (INN).
