= Doruxapapogene ralaplasmid/lalikinogene sifuplasmid =

Combination immunotherapy

Combination of
- Doruxapapogene ralaplasmid: Nonreplicating adenoviral vector-based immunotherapy
- Lalikinogene sifuplasmid: Plasmid DNA-based immunotherapy

Gene therapy
- Target gene: HPV6, HPV11

Clinical data
- Trade names: Voceryq
- Other names: INO-3107; INO3107, doruxapapogene ralaplasmid and lalikinogene sifuplasmid-gxfd
- AHFS/Drugs.com: Voceryq
- License data: US DailyMed: Doruxapapogene ralaplasmid lalikinogene sifuplasmid
- Routes of administration: Intramuscular

Legal status
- Legal status: US: ℞-only

Doruxapapogene ralaplasmid/lalikinogene sifuplasmid, sold under the brand name Voceryq, is a fixed-dose combination medication used for the treatment of recurrent respiratory papillomatosis. It is a recombinant plasmid DNA-based immunotherapy that contains doruxapapogene ralaplasmid, a nonreplicating adenoviral vector-based immunotherapy; and lalikinogene sifuplasmid, a plasmid DNA-based immunotherapy. It is given by intramuscular injection.

The most common side effects include injection site reactions, headache, fatigue, hypertension (high blood pressure), nausea, and dizziness.

Doruxapapogene ralaplasmid/lalikinogene sifuplasmid was approved for medical use in the United States in October 2026.

== Medical uses ==
Doruxapapogene ralaplasmid/lalikinogene sifuplasmid is indicated to reduce the frequency of surgical papilloma excisions in adults with recurrent respiratory papillomatosis.

Recurrent respiratory papillomatosis is a rare chronic disease characterized by wart-like growths caused by HPV types 6 and/or 11 forming in the airways, most often around the larynx (voice box), particularly the vocal cords. The growths, called papillomas, can cause symptoms like hoarseness, chronic coughing, and voice changes, and in severe cases, can spread to other parts of the respiratory tract, causing difficulty breathing. While surgery can remove the growths, there is no cure, and the virus persists in the tissue even after the growths are removed, so people often need repeated procedures over many years. In some cases, recurrent respiratory papillomatosis carries a risk of becoming cancerous over time.

== Mechanism of action ==
Doruxapapogene ralaplasmid/lalikinogene sifuplasmid is a recombinant plasmid DNA-based immunotherapy that delivers two plasmids (small pieces of DNA originally derived from bacteria) into the body's cells, one of which contains the genetic instructions for specific HPV proteins and the other an immune response-enhancing molecule called interleukin 12 (IL-12). The therapy is designed to stimulate the immune system to respond to and attack cells infected by the specific type(s) of HPV that cause recurrent respiratory papillomatosis (types 6 and 11).

== History ==
The safety and effectiveness of doruxapapogene ralaplasmid/lalikinogene sifuplasmid was evaluated in RRP-001, an open-label, multi-center clinical trial in 32 adults diagnosed with RRP. Eligible participants had two or more surgeries to remove laryngotracheal papillomas in the twelve months prior to treatment with doruxapapogene ralaplasmid/lalikinogene sifuplasmid, including a scheduled surgery at trial entry. Seven out of 26 participants who had at least three baseline surgeries did not require any surgery during the first year after treatment.

== Society and culture ==
=== Legal status ===
Doruxapapogene ralaplasmid/lalikinogene sifuplasmid was approved for medical use in the United States in October 2026. The US Food and Drug Administration (FDA) granted doruxapapogene ralaplasmid/lalikinogene sifuplasmid breakthrough therapy and orphan drug designations. The FDA granted accelerated approval of Voceryq to Inovio Pharmaceuticals.

=== Names ===
Doruxapapogene ralaplasmid/lalikinogene sifuplasmid is sold under the brand name Voceryq.
