= Thonzylamine =

Chemical compound

Clinical data
- Other names: Neohetramine
- AHFS/Drugs.com: International Drug Names
- ATC code: D04AA01 (WHO) R01AC06 (WHO) R06AC06 (WHO)

Identifiers
- IUPAC name: N-(4-methoxybenzyl)-N',N'-dimethyl-N-pyrimidin-2-ylethane-1,2-diamine
- CAS Number: 91-85-0 63-56-9
- PubChem CID: 5457
- DrugBank: DB11235
- ChemSpider: 5258
- UNII: R79646H5Z8
- KEGG: D08587
- ChEMBL: ChEMBL1623738
- CompTox Dashboard (EPA): DTXSID8043864
- ECHA InfoCard: 100.001.913

Chemical and physical data
- Formula: C_{16}H_{22}N_{4}O
- Molar mass: 286.379 g·mol^{−1}
- 3D model (JSmol): Interactive image
- SMILES: n1cccnc1N(CCN(C)C)Cc2ccc(OC)cc2
- InChI: InChI=1S/C16H22N4O/c1-19(2)11-12-20(16-17-9-4-10-18-16)13-14-5-7-15(21-3)8-6-14/h4-10H,11-13H2,1-3H3; Key:GULNIHOSWFYMRN-UHFFFAOYSA-N

Thonzylamine (or neohetramine) is an antihistamine and anticholinergic used as an antipruritic.

== Synthesis ==
Thonzylamine synthesis: H. L. Friedman and A, V. Tolstouhov, U.S. patent 2,465,865 (1949).

== See also ==
- Zolamine
