= Telimomab aritox =

Monoclonal antibody

Monoclonal antibody
- Type: Fab fragment
- Source: Mouse

Clinical data
- ATC code: none

Identifiers
- CAS Number: 117305-33-6
- ChemSpider: none
- UNII: A69GKQ6QV6

Telimomab aritox is a mouse monoclonal antibody which is an immunosuppressive drug. The antibody is linked to the A chain of the ricin protein (which is reflected by the aritox in the drug's name).

== See also ==
- Zolimomab aritox
