= Zilganersen =

Medication

Clinical data
- Pronunciation: zil-GAN-er-sen
- Trade names: Zanvastro
- Other names: ION-1166998, ION373
- AHFS/Drugs.com: Zanvastro
- License data: US DailyMed: Zilganersen
- Routes of administration: Intrathecal
- ATC code: None

Legal status
- Legal status: US: ℞-only

Identifiers
- CAS Number: 2305355-56-8
- DrugBank: DB18161
- UNII: AXQ9493NT2
- ChEBI: CHEBI:758995
- ChEMBL: ChEMBL5095433

Zilganersen, sold under the brand name Zanvastro, is a medication used for the treatment of Alexander disease. It is a glial fibrillary acidic protein (GFAP)-directed antisense oligonucleotide.

The most common side effects include vomiting, back pain, cough, headache, and post-lumbar puncture syndrome.

Zilganersen was approved for medical use in the United States in September 2026.

== Medical uses ==
Zilganersen is indicated for the treatment of Alexander disease.

Alexander disease is a rare, progressive neurological disorder caused by mutations in the gene that produces glial fibrillary acidic protein (GFAP). When this protein is abnormal, it accumulates in the brain's supportive cells, causing damage to the nervous system over time.

== Side effects ==
The most common side effects include vomiting, back pain, cough, headache, and post-lumbar puncture syndrome.

== History ==
The efficacy and safety of zilganersen were evaluated in a multi-center, randomized, controlled clinical study (NCT04849741) enrolling 49 pediatric and adult participants with Alexander disease two years of age and older, and in an open-label substudy of four participants less than two years of age.

== Society and culture ==
=== Legal status ===
Zilganersen was approved for medical use in the United States in September 2026. The US Food and Drug Administration (FDA) granted the application for zilganersen orphan drug, fast track, breakthrough therapy, and rare pediatric disease and priority review voucher designations. The FDA granted the approval of Zanvastro to Ionis Pharmaceuticals.

=== Names ===
Zilganersen is the international nonproprietary name.

Zilganersen is sold under the brand name Zanvastro.
