= Zilurgisertib =

Medication

Clinical data
- Trade names: Atebrioz
- Other names: INCB-000928, INCB000928
- AHFS/Drugs.com: Atebrioz
- License data: US DailyMed: Zilurgisertib
- Routes of administration: By mouth
- Drug class: Activin receptor-like kinase-2 (ALK2) inhibitor
- ATC code: None

Legal status
- Legal status: US: ℞-only

Identifiers
- CAS Number: 2173389-57-4; 2173390-29-7
- PubChem CID: 138628908; 162623634
- IUPHAR/BPS: 11888
- UNII: L5Z9S25HO2; 1R349830SB
- KEGG: D12547; D12548
- ChEMBL: ChEMBL5314579

Chemical and physical data
- Formula: C_{30}H_{38}N_{4}O_{3}
- Molar mass: 502.659 g·mol^{−1}
- 3D model (JSmol): Interactive image
- SMILES: C1COCCC1N2C[C@H]3C[C@]3(C2)C4=CC=C(C=C4)C5=CC(=C(N=C5)N)C(=O)NC67CCC(CC6)(CC7)O
- InChI: InChI=1S/C30H38N4O3/c31-26-25(27(35)33-28-7-10-29(36,11-8-28)12-9-28)15-21(17-32-26)20-1-3-22(4-2-20)30-16-23(30)18-34(19-30)24-5-13-37-14-6-24/h1-4,15,17,23-24,36H,5-14,16,18-19H2,(H2,31,32)(H,33,35)/t23-,28?,29?,30+/m1/s1; Key:KPRPFTOLWQQUAV-OCVAFRRMSA-N

Zilurgisertib, sold under the brand name Atebrioz, is a medication used for the treatment of fibrodysplasia ossificans progressiva. It is an activin receptor-like kinase-2 (ALK2) inhibitor.

Zilurgisertib was approved for medical use in the United States in September 2026.

== Medical uses ==
Zilurgisertib is indicated to reduce the volume of total new heterotopic ossification (bone formation outside the skeleton) in people aged twelve years of age and older with fibrodysplasia ossificans progressiva.

Fibrodysplasia ossificans progressiva is a rare genetic disease caused by a mutation in activin A receptor-type 1, which controls new bone growth. As a result, connective tissues such as muscle, tendons, and ligaments gradually turn into bone, causing limited movement, deformities, severe disability, and early death.

== Adverse effects ==
Zilurgisertib can cause fetal harm based on data from animal studies.

The most common side effects include headache, joint pain, upper respiratory tract infection, nosebleeds, and nausea.

== History ==
The effectiveness of zilurgisertib was evaluated in a randomized, double-blind, placebo‑controlled trial (NCT05090891) in which 63 participants with FOP were randomly assigned to receive zilurgisertib 100 mg or placebo once daily for 24 weeks followed by a 292-week, single-arm, open-label extension period during which participants received zilurgisertib 100 mg daily.

== Society and culture ==
=== Legal status ===
Zilurgisertib was approved for medical use in the United States in September 2026. The US Food and Drug Administration granted the application for zilurgisertib fast track, priority review, and orphan drug designations for this indication.

=== Names ===
Zilurgisertib is the international nonproprietary name.

Zilurgisertib is sold under the brand name Atebrioz.
