= Zaurategrast =

Chemical compound

Clinical data
- Other names: CDP323

Legal status
- Legal status: Investigational

Identifiers
- IUPAC name: (2S)-2-[(2-Bromo-3-oxospiro[3.5]non-1-en-1-yl)amino]-3-[4-(2,7-naphthyridin-1-ylamino)phenyl]propanoic acid
- CAS Number: 455264-31-0
- PubChem CID: 10186367
- ChemSpider: 8361869
- UNII: 06A0IC74I3
- CompTox Dashboard (EPA): DTXSID90196547
- ECHA InfoCard: 100.158.922

Chemical and physical data
- Formula: C_{26}H_{25}BrN_{4}O_{3}
- Molar mass: 521.415 g·mol^{−1}
- 3D model (JSmol): Interactive image
- SMILES: C1CCC2(CC1)C(=C(C2=O)Br)N[C@@H](CC3=CC=C(C=C3)NC4=NC=CC5=C4C=NC=C5)C(=O)O
- InChI: InChI=1S/C26H25BrN4O3/c27-21-22(26(23(21)32)10-2-1-3-11-26)31-20(25(33)34)14-16-4-6-18(7-5-16)30-24-19-15-28-12-8-17(19)9-13-29-24/h4-9,12-13,15,20,31H,1-3,10-11,14H2,(H,29,30)(H,33,34)/t20-/m0/s1; Key:KYHVWHYLKOHLKA-FQEVSTJZSA-N

Zaurategrast (CDP323) is a small-molecule prodrug antagonist of the vascular cell adhesion molecule 1 (VCAM-1) binding to α4-integrins. It was originally developed by the British biopharmaceutical company Celltech plc. (now UCB S.A.) and was a putative new drug for oral treatment of multiple sclerosis.

In October 2006, UCB and Biogen Idec announced a collaboration to jointly develop and commercialize zaurategrast for the treatment of multiple sclerosis and other potential indications. In June 2009, development of zaurategrast was discontinued due to discouraging results of a Phase II clinical trial.

== Mechanism of action ==
The mechanism of action of zaurategrast were believed to rely on preventing immune cells to migrate from blood vessels through the vessel walls to reach various inflamed tissues, including the brain. This mechanism is thought to prevent overshooting immune reactions and subsequent tissue damage as seen during uncontrolled immune cell migration as in multiple sclerosis. Zaurategrast has the same mechanism of action as the monoclonal antibody natalizumab.

== Results in animal models ==
Zaurategrast was investigated in chronic experimental autoimmune encephalomyelitis (EAE) in mice. The drug was effective when given prophylactically (i.e., before the disease was induced in mice) and when given therapeutically (i.e., after outbreak of the disease) and reduced the disease severity significantly.

== Clinical development ==
The safety, tolerability, and pharmacokinetic profile of zaurategrast have been evaluated in 75 female and male healthy volunteers in three separate Phase 1 studies. Zaurategrast was well tolerated at oral doses up to 1000 mg given twice daily for 7 consecutive days with an adverse event profile comparable to that observed with placebo. There was no gender effect. The oral administration resulted in inhibition of VCAM-1 binding which could be maintained throughout a 12‑ or 24‑hour dose interval at well tolerated doses

A Phase 2 study commenced in June 2007 in Europe and in the US. The study intends to enroll over 200 patients with relapsing MS who have failed earlier treatment with an interferon-beta and will compare two doses of the drug to placebo over a period of six months. The results are expected by the end of 2008., Preliminary interim efficacy analysis showed that patients enrolled in this clinical trial did not benefit as expected from zaurategrast compared to placebo after a six-month treatment period. No cases of progressive multifocal leukoencephalopathy were noted.
