= Zilucoplan =

Chemical compound

Clinical data
- Trade names: Zilbrysq
- Other names: RA101495
- AHFS/Drugs.com: Monograph
- MedlinePlus: a624002
- License data: US DailyMed: Zilucoplan
- Pregnancy category: AU: D
- Routes of administration: Subcutaneous
- Drug class: Complement inhibitor
- ATC code: L04AJ06 (WHO)

Legal status
- Legal status: AU: S4 (Prescription only); CA: ℞-only; US: ℞-only; EU: Rx-only

Identifiers
- IUPAC name: (2S)-2-[[(2S)-2-[[(2S)-1-[(2S)-2-[[(2S)-2-[[(2S)-2-[[(2S)-2-[[(2S)-2-[[(2S)-2-[[(2S,5S,8S,11S,14S,22S)-22-acetamido-11-benzyl-8-(3-carbamimidamidopropyl)-5-(2-carboxyethyl)-3,6,9,12,16,23-hexaoxo-2-propan-2-yl-1,4,7,10,13,17-hexazacyclotricosane-14-carbonyl]-methylamino]-3-carboxypropanoyl]amino]-3,3-dimethylbutanoyl]amino]-3-(4-hydroxyphenyl)propanoyl]amino]-3-(1H-pyrrolo[2,3-b]pyridin-3-yl)propanoyl]amino]-4-carboxybutanoyl]amino]-3-(4-hydroxyphenyl)propanoyl]pyrrolidine-2-carbonyl]amino]-2-cyclohexylacetyl]amino]-6-[3-[2-[2-[2-[2-[2-[2-[2-[2-[2-[2-[2-[2-[2-[2-[2-[2-[2-[2-[2-[2-[2-[2-[2-[2-[[(4S)-4-carboxy-4-(hexadecanoylamino)butanoyl]amino]ethoxy]ethoxy]ethoxy]ethoxy]ethoxy]ethoxy]ethoxy]ethoxy]ethoxy]ethoxy]ethoxy]ethoxy]ethoxy]ethoxy]ethoxy]ethoxy]ethoxy]ethoxy]ethoxy]ethoxy]ethoxy]ethoxy]ethoxy]ethoxy]propanoylamino]hexanoic acid
- CAS Number: 1841136-73-9
- PubChem CID: 133083018
- DrugBank: DB15636
- ChemSpider: 71115966
- UNII: YG391PK0CC
- KEGG: D12357
- ChEBI: CHEBI:229659

Chemical and physical data
- Formula: C_{172}H_{278}N_{24}O_{55}
- Molar mass: 3562.229 g·mol^{−1}
- 3D model (JSmol): Interactive image
- SMILES: CCCCCCCCCCCCCCCC(=O)N[C@@H](CCC(=O)NCCOCCOCCOCCOCCOCCOCCOCCOCCOCCOCCOCCOCCOCCOCCOCCOCCOCCOCCOCCOCCOCCOCCOCCOCCC(=O)NCCCC[C@H](NC(=O)[C@@H](NC(=O)[C@@H]1CCCN1C(=O)[C@H](CC1=CC=C(O)C=C1)NC(=O)[C@H](CCC(O)=O)NC(=O)[C@H](CC1=CNC2=NC=CC=C12)NC(=O)[C@H](CC1=CC=C(O)C=C1)NC(=O)[C@@H](NC(=O)[C@H](CC(O)=O)N(C)C(=O)[C@@H]1CC(=O)NCCCC[C@H](NC(C)=O)C(=O)N[C@@H](C(C)C)C(=O)N[C@@H](CCC(O)=O)C(=O)N[C@@H](CCCNC(N)=N)C(=O)N[C@@H](CC2=CC=CC=C2)C(=O)N1)C(C)(C)C)C1CCCCC1)C(O)=O)C(O)=O
- InChI: InChI=1S/C172H278N24O55/c1-9-10-11-12-13-14-15-16-17-18-19-20-27-44-146(202)182-136(170(226)227)53-56-144(200)177-64-67-229-69-71-231-73-75-233-77-79-235-81-83-237-85-87-239-89-91-241-93-95-243-97-99-245-101-103-247-105-107-249-109-111-251-113-112-250-110-108-248-106-104-246-102-100-244-98-96-242-94-92-240-90-88-238-86-84-236-82-80-234-78-76-232-74-72-230-70-68-228-66-59-145(201)175-60-31-29-41-135(169(224)225)186-165(220)152(126-37-25-22-26-38-126)193-162(217)142-43-34-65-196(142)168(223)140(116-125-47-51-129(199)52-48-125)190-157(212)133(54-57-148(204)205)184-161(216)139(117-127-120-180-154-130(127)39-32-62-178-154)188-159(214)138(115-124-45-49-128(198)50-46-124)189-166(221)153(172(5,6)7)194-163(218)143(119-150(208)209)195(8)167(222)141-118-147(203)176-61-30-28-40-131(181-122(4)197)158(213)192-151(121(2)3)164(219)185-134(55-58-149(206)207)156(211)183-132(42-33-63-179-171(173)174)155(210)187-137(160(215)191-141)114-123-35-23-21-24-36-123/h21,23-24,32,35-36,39,45-52,62,120-121,126,131-143,151-153,198-199H,9-20,22,25-31,33-34,37-38,40-44,53-61,63-119H2,1-8H3,(H,175,201)(H,176,203)(H,177,200)(H,178,180)(H,181,197)(H,182,202)(H,183,211)(H,184,216)(H,185,219)(H,186,220)(H,187,210)(H,188,214)(H,189,221)(H,190,212)(H,191,215)(H,192,213)(H,193,217)(H,194,218)(H,204,205)(H,206,207)(H,208,209)(H,224,225)(H,226,227)(H4,173,174,179)/t131-,132-,133-,134-,135-,136-,137-,138-,139-,140-,141-,142-,143-,151-,152-,153+/m0/s1; Key:JDXCOXKBIGBZSK-PSNKNOTQSA-N

Zilucoplan, sold under the brand name Zilbrysq, is a medication used for the treatment of generalized myasthenia gravis. It is a complement inhibitor that is injected subcutaneously (under the skin).

Zilucoplan is a cyclic peptide that binds to the protein complement component 5 (C5) and inhibits its cleavage into C5a and C5b.

Zilucoplan was approved for medical use in the United States in October 2023, in the European Union in December 2023, and in Australia in July 2024.

== Medical uses ==
Zilucoplan is indicated for the treatment of generalized myasthenia gravis in adults who are anti-acetylcholine receptor antibody positive.

== Society and culture ==
=== Legal status ===
In September 2023, the Committee for Medicinal Products for Human Use (CHMP) of the European Medicines Agency (EMA) adopted a positive opinion, recommending the granting of a marketing authorization for the medicinal product Zilbrysq, intended for the treatment of myasthenia gravis. The applicant for this medicinal product is UCB Pharma S.A. Zilucoplan was approved for medical use in the Europea Union in December 2023.

Zilucoplan was granted orphan drug designation by the US Food and Drug Administration (FDA) in August 2019, and by the EMA in July 2022.

=== Brand names ===
Zilucoplan is the international nonproprietary name.

Zilucoplan is sold under the brand name Zilbrysq.
