= Zolamine =

Chemical compound

Identifiers
- IUPAC name: N′-[(4-Methoxyphenyl)methyl]-N,N-dimethyl-N′-(1,3-thiazol-2-yl)ethane-1,2-diamine
- CAS Number: 553-13-9
- PubChem CID: 14387
- ChemSpider: 13745
- UNII: NXB79TB0N2
- CompTox Dashboard (EPA): DTXSID00203817

Chemical and physical data
- Formula: C_{15}H_{21}N_{3}OS
- Molar mass: 291.41 g·mol^{−1}
- 3D model (JSmol): Interactive image
- SMILES: CN(C)CCN(Cc1ccc(cc1)OC)c2nccs2
- InChI: InChI=1S/C15H21N3OS/c1-17(2)9-10-18(15-16-8-11-20-15)12-13-4-6-14(19-3)7-5-13/h4-8,11H,9-10,12H2,1-3H3; Key:KYBJXENQEZJILU-UHFFFAOYSA-N

Zolamine is an antihistamine and anticholinergic used as an antipruritic.

== See also ==
- Thonzylamine
