= Loteprednol/tobramycin =

Medication

Combination of
- Loteprednol: Corticosteroid
- Tobramycin: Aminoglycoside antibiotic

Clinical data
- Trade names: Zylet
- AHFS/Drugs.com: Micromedex Detailed Consumer Information
- License data: US DailyMed: Loteprednol and tobramycin
- Routes of administration: Ophthalmic
- ATC code: S01CA12 (WHO)

Legal status
- Legal status: US: ℞-only

Identifiers
- CAS Number: 863983-05-5
- KEGG: D12133

Loteprednol/tobramycin, sold under the brand name Zylet, is a fixed-dose combination medication used for the treatment of inflammation of the eye. It is a combination of loteprednol, as the etabonate, a corticosteroid; and tobramycin, an aminoglycoside antibiotic. It is used as drops in the eye.

Loteprednol/tobramycin was approved for medical use in the United States in December 2004.
