= Zafuleptine =

Chemical compound

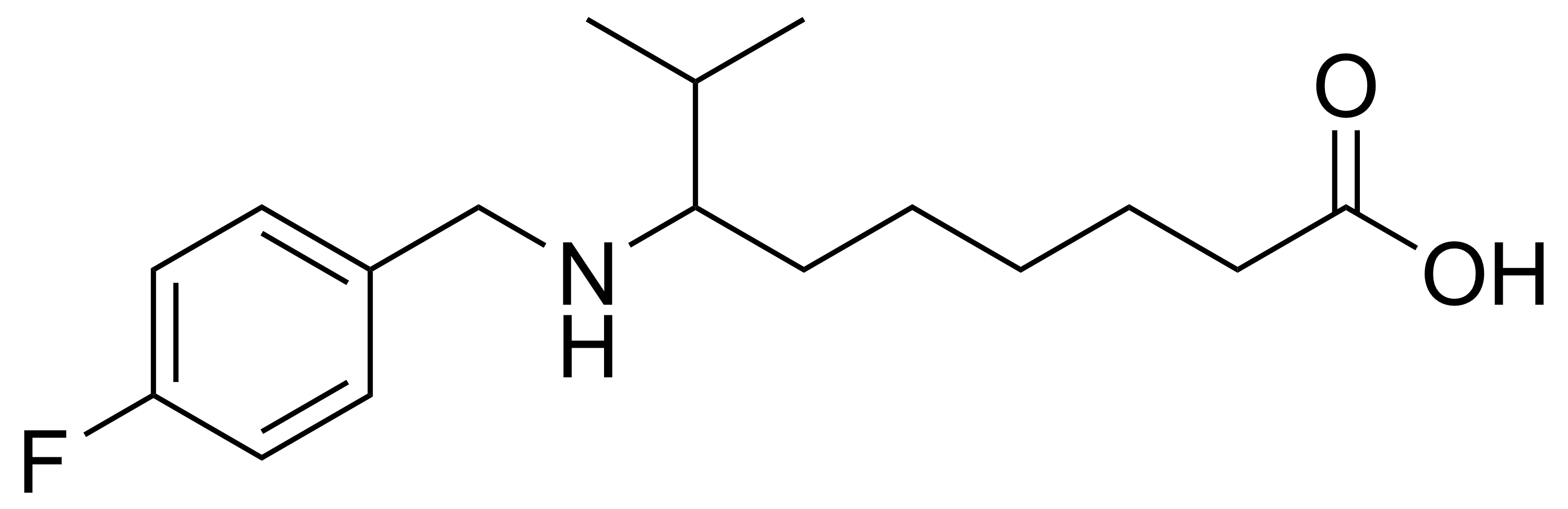

Clinical data
- ATC code: None

Identifiers
- IUPAC name: 7-[(4-fluorobenzyl)amino]-8-methylnonanoic acid
- CAS Number: 59209-97-1
- PubChem CID: 68789
- ChemSpider: 62029
- UNII: E697IIC25J
- CompTox Dashboard (EPA): DTXSID60866745
- ECHA InfoCard: 100.056.035

Chemical and physical data
- Formula: C_{17}H_{26}FNO_{2}
- Molar mass: 295.398 g·mol^{−1}
- 3D model (JSmol): Interactive image
- SMILES: Fc1ccc(cc1)CNC(CCCCCC(=O)O)C(C)C

Zafuleptine (INN; proposed brand name Thymeon) is an antidepressant developed in the mid-1970s which, despite apparently having a chosen brand name, was never marketed.
