= Zofenopril =

Antihypertensive drug of the ACE inhibitor class

Clinical data
- Trade names: Zocardis (RU)
- AHFS/Drugs.com: International Drug Names
- Routes of administration: Oral
- ATC code: C09AA15 (WHO)

Identifiers
- IUPAC name: (2S,4S)-1-[(2S)-3-benzoylsulfanyl-2-methylpropanoyl]-4-phenylsulfanylpyrrolidine-2-carboxylic acid
- CAS Number: 81872-10-8
- PubChem CID: 92400
- IUPHAR/BPS: 6462
- DrugBank: DB13166
- ChemSpider: 83422
- UNII: 290ZY759PI
- KEGG: D08688
- ChEBI: CHEBI:78539
- ChEMBL: ChEMBL331378
- CompTox Dashboard (EPA): DTXSID0046640

Chemical and physical data
- Formula: C_{22}H_{23}NO_{4}S_{2}
- Molar mass: 429.55 g·mol^{−1}
- 3D model (JSmol): Interactive image
- SMILES: O=C(N2[C@H](C(=O)O)C[C@H](Sc1ccccc1)C2)[C@H](C)CSC(=O)c3ccccc3
- InChI: InChI=1S/C22H23NO4S2/c1-15(14-28-22(27)16-8-4-2-5-9-16)20(24)23-13-18(12-19(23)21(25)26)29-17-10-6-3-7-11-17/h2-11,15,18-19H,12-14H2,1H3,(H,25,26)/t15-,18+,19+/m1/s1; Key:IAIDUHCBNLFXEF-MNEFBYGVSA-N

Zofenopril (INN) is a medication that protects the heart and helps reduce high blood pressure. It is an angiotensin-converting enzyme (ACE) inhibitor.

In small studies, zofenopril appeared significantly more effective in reducing hypertension than two older antihypertensive drugs, atenolol and enalapril, and was associated with fewer adverse effects.

Zofenopril is a prodrug with zofenoprilat as the active metabolite.

It was patented in 1978 and approved for medical use in 2000.
