= Hepatolithiasis =

- Other names: Hepatic cholelithiasis, gallstones of the hepatic duct
- Specialty: Hepatology

Hepatolithiasis is the presence of gallstones in the biliary ducts of the liver. Treatment is usually surgical. It is rare in Western countries, but prevalent in East Asia.

The gallstones are normally found proximal to the left and right hepatic ducts. The causes of the disease are poorly understood, but it is suspected that genetics, diets and environmental causes may contribute. It is more common in those of low socioeconomic status who suffer from malnutrition. Typically it strikes between 50 and 70 years old, with neither men nor women more likely to acquire it.

The prevalence in east Asia ranges is as high as 30-50%, while in the west it is rare. However, immigration has increased its prevalence in the West. Countries that have seen more economic development have also seen a reduction in the rates of the disease.

Some patients have these gallstones with no symptoms and the disease is only detected through abdominal imaging. For those with symptoms, common ones are abdominal pain, jaundice and fever. The gallstones can cause more serious conditions like fibrinolysis disorder or gallstone pancreatitis.

== Signs and symptoms ==
Abdominal pain, fever, and jaundice are common initial symptoms; however, cholangiocarcinoma is a chronic harmful outcome of the illness.

Summary table

SYMPTOM / SIGN	TYPICAL FEATURES
RUQ pain	Recurrent, colicky, post-prandial
Cholangitis	Fever + chills + RUQ tenderness
Jaundice	Fluctuating, dark urine, pale stools
Pruritus	Intense, bile-salt related
Hepatomegaly	Firm, nodular liver edge
Systemic	Night sweats, fatigue, weight loss
Alarm signs	High fever, hypotension, GI bleeding

== Causes ==
Hepatic atrophy, liver cirrhosis, biliary stricture, hepatic abscess, history of recurrent cholangitis, and a poor prognosis for intrahepatic cholangiocarcinoma are among the conditions that can cause hepatolithiasis.

== Diagnosis ==
Accurately identifying stones, biliary strictures, and affected liver segments is crucial for the diagnosis of hepatolithiasis, as is ruling out concurrent cholangiocarcinoma. Hepatolithiasis is primarily diagnosed by abdominal ultrasonography (USG) and computed tomography (CT) scans.

== Treatment ==
Treatment for hepatolithiasis is multidisciplinary and involves removing stones and bile stasis. Although the optimal course of treatment for intrahepatic stones is still unknown, there are several noninvasive and surgical options. However, the principal objective ought to be the complete elimination of stones and the eradication of biliary stasis and infection. Hepatolithiasis non-surgical treatment options include percutaneous transhepatic cholangioscopy lithotripsy, as well as hepatectomy as part of surgical management.

== See also ==
- Gallstone
- Cholangiocarcinoma
