= Zanidatamab =

Medication

Monoclonal antibody
- Type: Whole antibody
- Source: Humanized (from mouse)
- Target: HER2

Clinical data
- Trade names: Ziihera
- Other names: ZW25, zanidatamab-hrii
- AHFS/Drugs.com: Monograph
- License data: US DailyMed: Zanidatamab
- Routes of administration: Intravenous infusion
- Drug class: Antineoplastic
- ATC code: L01FD07 (WHO)

Legal status
- Legal status: CA: ℞-only; US: ℞-only; EU: Rx-only

Identifiers
- CAS Number: 2169946-15-8
- DrugBank: DB15471
- UNII: Z20OC92TDI
- KEGG: D12011

Chemical and physical data
- Formula: C_{5553}H_{8526}N_{1482}O_{1726}S_{36}
- Molar mass: 124818.10 g·mol^{−1}

Zanidatamab, sold under the brand name Ziihera, is a humanized monoclonal antibody used for the treatment of HER2-positive biliary tract cancer and gastroesophageal adenocarcinoma. It is an IgG-like bispecific HER2-directed antibody directed against two non-overlapping domains of HER2. Zanidatamab is produced in Chinese hamster ovary cells.

The most common adverse reactions include diarrhea, infusion-related reaction, abdominal pain, and fatigue.

Zanidatamab was first granted accelerated approval for medical use in the United States on November 21, 2024, and gained full approval for gastroesophageal cancer on August 25, 2026. The US Food and Drug Administration (FDA) considers it to be a first-in-class medication.

== Medical uses ==
Zanidatamab is indicated for the treatment of adults with previously treated, unresectable or metastatic HER2-positive (IHC 3+) biliary tract cancer, as detected by an FDA-approved test.

== Adverse effects ==
The US Food and Drug Administration prescribing information contains a boxed warning for embryo-fetal toxicity.

The most common adverse reactions include diarrhea, infusion-related reactions, abdominal pain, and fatigue.

== History ==
Efficacy was evaluated in HERIZON-BTC-01 (NCT04466891), an open-label multicenter, single-arm trial in 62 participants with unresectable or metastatic HER2-positive (IHC3+) biliary tract cancer. Participants were required to have received at least one prior gemcitabine-containing regimen in the advanced disease setting.

The US Food and Drug Administration (FDA) granted the application for zanidatamab priority review, breakthrough therapy, and orphan drug designations.

== Society and culture ==
=== Legal status ===
Zanidatamab was approved for medical use in the United States in November 2024.

In April 2025, the Committee for Medicinal Products for Human Use of the European Medicines Agency adopted a positive opinion, recommending the granting of a conditional marketing authorization for the medicinal product Ziihera, intended for the treatment of adults with unresectable locally advanced or metastatic HER2-positive biliary tract cancer. The applicant for this medicinal product is Jazz Pharmaceuticals Ireland Limited. Zanidatamab was authorized for medical use in the European Union in June 2025.

=== Names ===
Zanidatamab is the international nonproprietary name.

Zanidatamab is sold under the brand name Ziihera.
