= Zopapogene imadenovec =

Medication

Clinical data
- Trade names: Papzimeos
- Other names: PRGN-2012, zopapogene imadenovec-drba
- AHFS/Drugs.com: Papzimeos
- License data: US DailyMed: Zopapogene imadenovec
- Routes of administration: Subcutaneous
- ATC code: None

Legal status
- Legal status: US: ℞-only

Identifiers
- CAS Number: 2864817-42-3
- UNII: C525BYS7TP
- KEGG: D13165

Zopapogene imadenovec, sold under the brand name Papzimeos, is a medication used for the treatment of recurrent respiratory papillomatosis. Zopapogene imadenovec is a first-of-its-kind non-replicating adenoviral vector-based immunotherapy. It is given by injection under the skin (subcutaneous).

Zopapogene imadenovec was approved for medical use in the United States in August 2025.

== Medical uses ==
Zopapogene imadenovec is indicated for the treatment of adults with recurrent respiratory papillomatosis.

Recurrent respiratory papillomatosis is a rare, chronic disease caused by persistent human papillomavirus (HPV) 6 or 11 infection, leading to the growth of benign tumors in the respiratory tract, most commonly the larynx. The disease is associated with significant morbidity, including voice changes, breathing difficulties, and airway obstruction.

== History ==
The US Food and Drug Administration (FDA) approved zopapogene imadenovec based on results from a single-arm, open-label trial evaluating zopapogene imadenovec in adults with recurrent respiratory papillomatosis who required three or more surgeries per year. Participants received four subcutaneous injections of zopapogene imadenovec over twelve weeks following surgical debulking (reduction) procedures. In the pivotal portion of the study, 51.4% of participants (18/35) achieved a complete response—defined as no need for surgical intervention in the twelve months following treatment. Follow-up data showed that durable responses were maintained in most participants through two years, with a strong correlation between clinical benefit and the induction of HPV 6/11-specific T cells.

The FDA granted the application for zopapogene imadenovec priority review, orphan drug, and breakthrough therapy designations. The FDA granted approval of Papzimeos to Precigen.

== Society and culture ==
=== Legal status ===
Zopapogene imadenovec was approved for medical use in the United States in August 2025.

=== Name ===
Zopapogene imadenovec is the international nonproprietary name.

Zopapogene imadenovec is sold under the brand name Papzimeos.
