= Zofenoprilat =

Names
- IUPAC name (4S)-N-[(2S)-2-Methyl-3-sulfanylpropanoyl]-4-(phenylsulfanyl)-L-proline
- Systematic IUPAC name (2S,4S)-1-[(2S)-2-Methyl-3-sulfanylpropanoyl]-4-(phenylsulfanyl)pyrrolidine-2-carboxylic acid

Identifiers
CAS Number	75176-37-3
3D model (JSmol)	Interactive image
ChEBI	CHEBI:82602
ChEMBL	ChEMBL16332
ChemSpider	24540938
DrugBank	DB08766
PubChem CID	3034048
UNII	4G4WDK2YBS
CompTox Dashboard (EPA)	DTXSID50231443
- InChI: InChI=1S/C15H19NO3S2/c1-10(9-20)14(17)16-8-12(7-13(16)15(18)19)21-11-5-3-2-4-6-11/h2-6,10,12-13,20H,7-9H2,1H3,(H,18,19)/t10-,12-,13-/m0/s1 Key: UQWLOWFDKAFKAP-DRZSPHRISA-N; InChI=1/C15H19NO3S2/c1-10(9-20)14(17)16-8-12(7-13(16)15(18)19)21-11-5-3-2-4-6-11/h2-6,10,12-13,20H,7-9H2,1H3,(H,18,19)/t10-,12-,13-/m0/s1 Key: UQWLOWFDKAFKAP-DRZSPHRIBV
- SMILES: C[C@H](CS)C(=O)N1C[C@H](C[C@H]1C(O)=O)SC1=CC=CC=C1

Properties
Chemical formula	C_{15}H_{19}NO_{3}S_{2}
Molar mass	325.44 g·mol^{−1}
- Except where otherwise noted, data are given for materials in their standard state (at 25 °C [77 °F], 100 kPa). Infobox references

Zofenoprilat is an angiotensin-converting enzyme inhibitor, and is the free sulfhydryl active metabolite of zofenopril.
