= Zolimomab aritox =

Monoclonal antibody

Monoclonal antibody
- Type: Whole antibody
- Source: Mouse
- Target: CD5

Clinical data
- ATC code: none

Identifiers
- CAS Number: 141483-72-9
- ChemSpider: none
- UNII: 2C1ZT922TD
- KEGG: D06381

Zolimomab aritox is a mouse monoclonal antibody which has been investigated for the treatment of systemic lupus erythematosus and graft-versus-host disease, but the studies failed to show positive effects of the drug.

It is an anti-CD5 antibody which is linked to the A chain of the ricin protein (which is reflected by the aritox in the drug's name).

== See also ==
- Telimomab aritox
