= Zanolimumab =

Human monoclonal antibody

Monoclonal antibody
- Type: Whole antibody
- Source: Human
- Target: CD4

Clinical data
- ATC code: none

Identifiers
- CAS Number: 652153-01-0
- ChemSpider: none
- UNII: HG3L8885M0
- KEGG: D06356

Chemical and physical data
- Molar mass: 147 kg/mol

Zanolimumab is an investigational human monoclonal antibody and an immunosuppressive drug. It was developed with the goal of treatment of rheumatoid arthritis, psoriasis, melanoma, cutaneous and peripheral T-cell lymphoma. Development of the drug was ultimately discontinued with termination of all trials.
