= Jean-François Calot =

French surgeon (1861–1944)

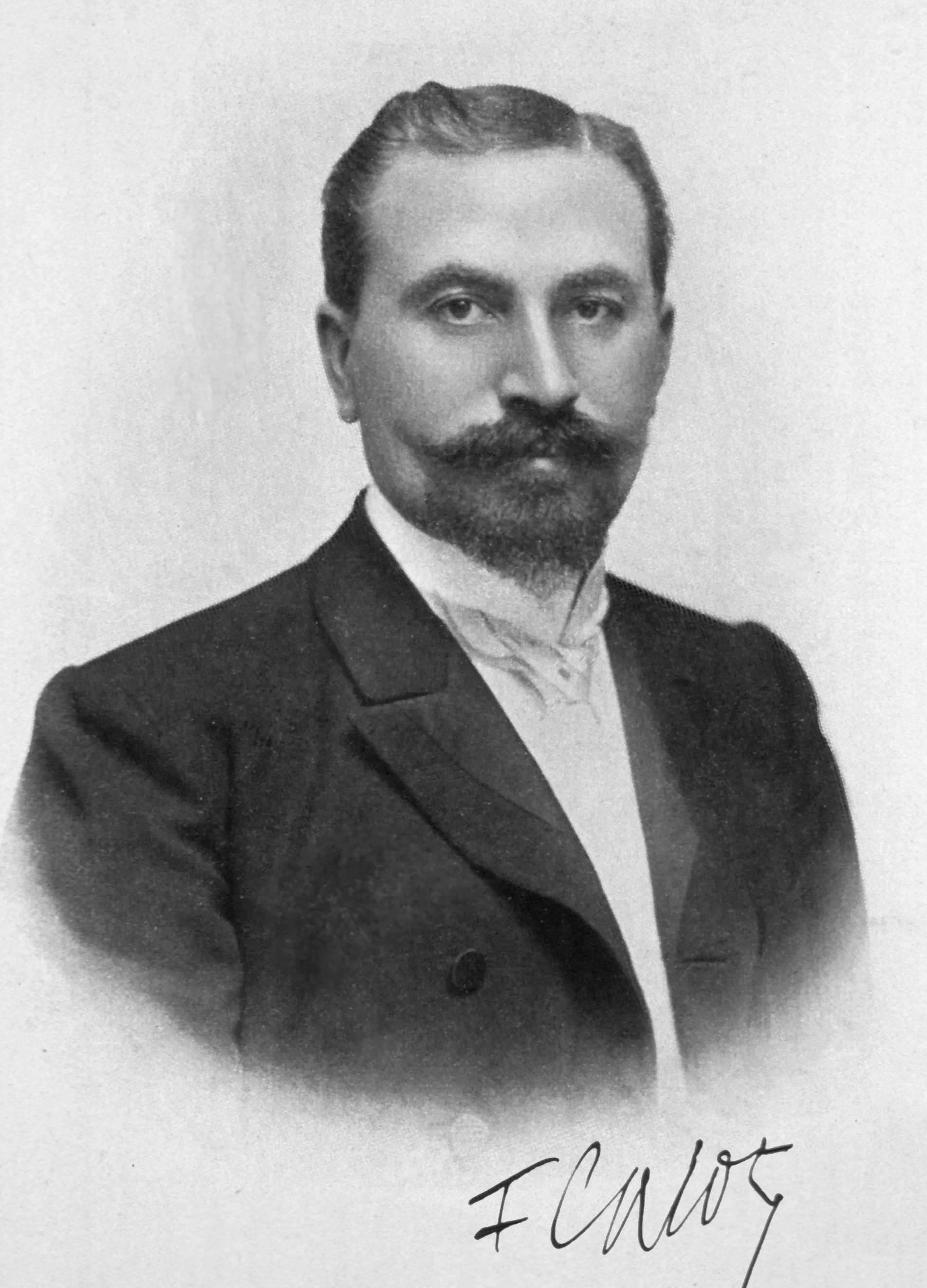

Jean-François Calot (17 May 1861 – 1 March 1944) was a French surgeon best known for describing treatment of curvature of the spine in Pott's disease. He also described a method of treating tuberculous abscesses and defined Calot's triangle.

== Biography ==
Calot was born in a farmer family of six children and spent his childhood in Arrens-Marsous, France. He received his bachelor's degree in 1880 at Saint-Pe de Bigorre and in 1881 moved to Paris, where he worked as a tutor to pay for his university education. While still a student he described Calot's triangle in his doctoral thesis, defended on 12 December 1890. He then worked as a surgeon at l'Hôpital Rotschild and l'Hôpital Cazin-Perrochaud in Berck. He described his technique for treating Pott's disease of the spine in a paper he read to the Academy of Medicine in Paris in 1896. Much of his work later in his career was in orthopaedic surgery, particularly the treatment of war injuries; he founded the Institut orthopédique de Berck in 1900.

Callot married Marie Bacqueville (1870–1934), and together they had four daughters.

== Eponyms ==
- Calot's triangle – isosceles triangle bounded by the common hepatic duct, the cystic duct and the cystic artery; it remains an important landmark for surgeons performing cholecystectomy to avoid damaging the common bile duct.
- Calot's node – gallbladder lymph node.
- Calot's method – treatment of tuberculous abscesses by repeated puncture and immobilisation.
- Calot's operation – surgical correction of spinal deformity due to Pott's disease (spinal tuberculosis).
