= Cystohepatic triangle =

Space between the cystic duct, the common hepatic duct, and the liver

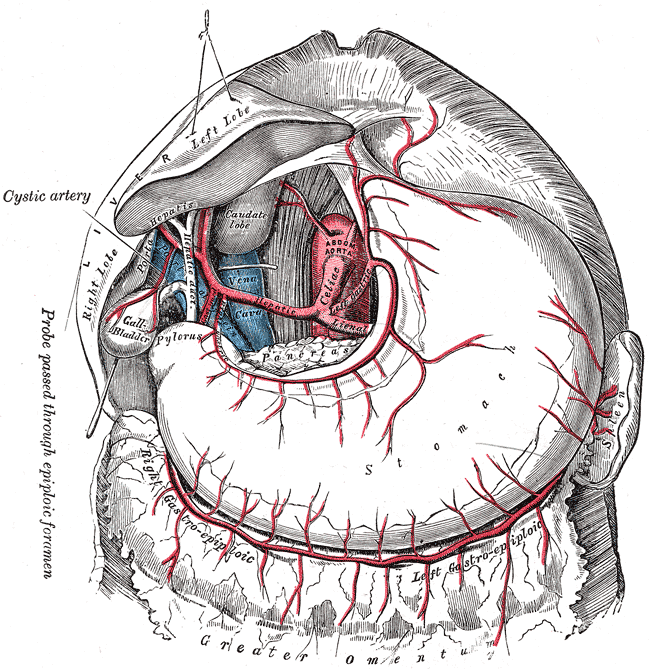
- The cystic artery branches from the right hepatic artery.

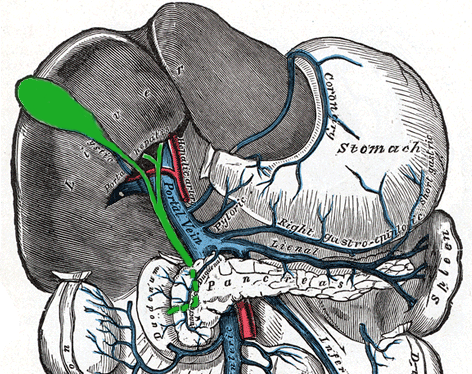
- Relationship to other vessels

Details

Identifiers
- Latin: trigonum cystohepaticum
- TA98: A10.1.02.428
- TA2: 3756
- FMA: 24230

The cystohepatic triangle (or hepatobiliary triangle or Calot's triangle) is an anatomic space bordered by the cystic duct laterally, the common hepatic duct medially, and the inferior surface of the liver superiorly.

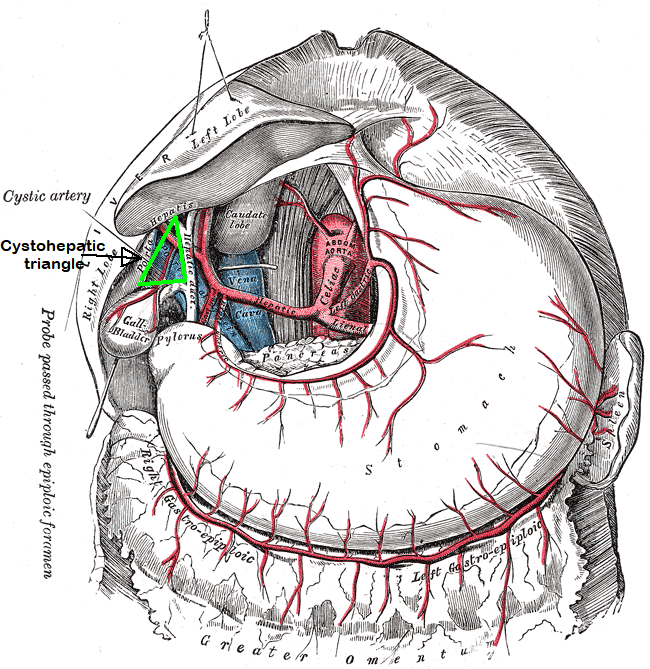
Cystohepatic triangle, marked with green

The cystic artery lies within the hepatobiliary triangle. The triangle is used to locate the cystic artery during a laparoscopic cholecystectomy.

== Structure ==
The hepatobiliary triangle is the area bounded by the:

- cystic duct inferiorly
- common hepatic duct medially
- inferior margin of the liver superiorly

It is covered in peritoneum both anteriorly and posteriorly.

=== Contents ===
The triangle contains: adipose and connective tissue, lymphatic vessels and the cystic lymph node, autonomic nerves, (usually) cystic artery, and (sometimes) an accessory cystic duct. The right hepatic artery may also pass through the hepatobiliary triangle.

== Clinical significance ==
The anatomy and variant anatomy of this region is important during gallbladder removal to prevent iatrogenic injury to the common hepatic duct, bile duct, or right hepatic artery.

The cystic artery lies within the hepatobiliary triangle, which is used to locate it during a laparoscopic cholecystectomy. It may also contain an accessory right hepatic artery or an anomalous sectoral bile ducts. As a result, dissection in the triangle of Calot is ill-advised until the lateral-most structures have been cleared and identification of the cystic duct is definitive. According to SESAP 12 (produced and distributed by the American College of Surgeons) dissection in the triangle of Calot is the most common cause of common bile duct injuries.

== History ==
Another name used to refer to the hepatobiliary triangle is Calot's triangle, after Jean-François Calot. Calot's original description of the triangle in 1890 included the cystic duct, the common hepatic duct, and the cystic artery (not the inferior border of the liver as is commonly believed).
