= Common duct =

Common duct may refer to:

- Common hepatic duct
- Common bile duct
