= Intraductal papillary neoplasm of the bile duct =

- Other names: Intraductal papillary biliary neoplasm
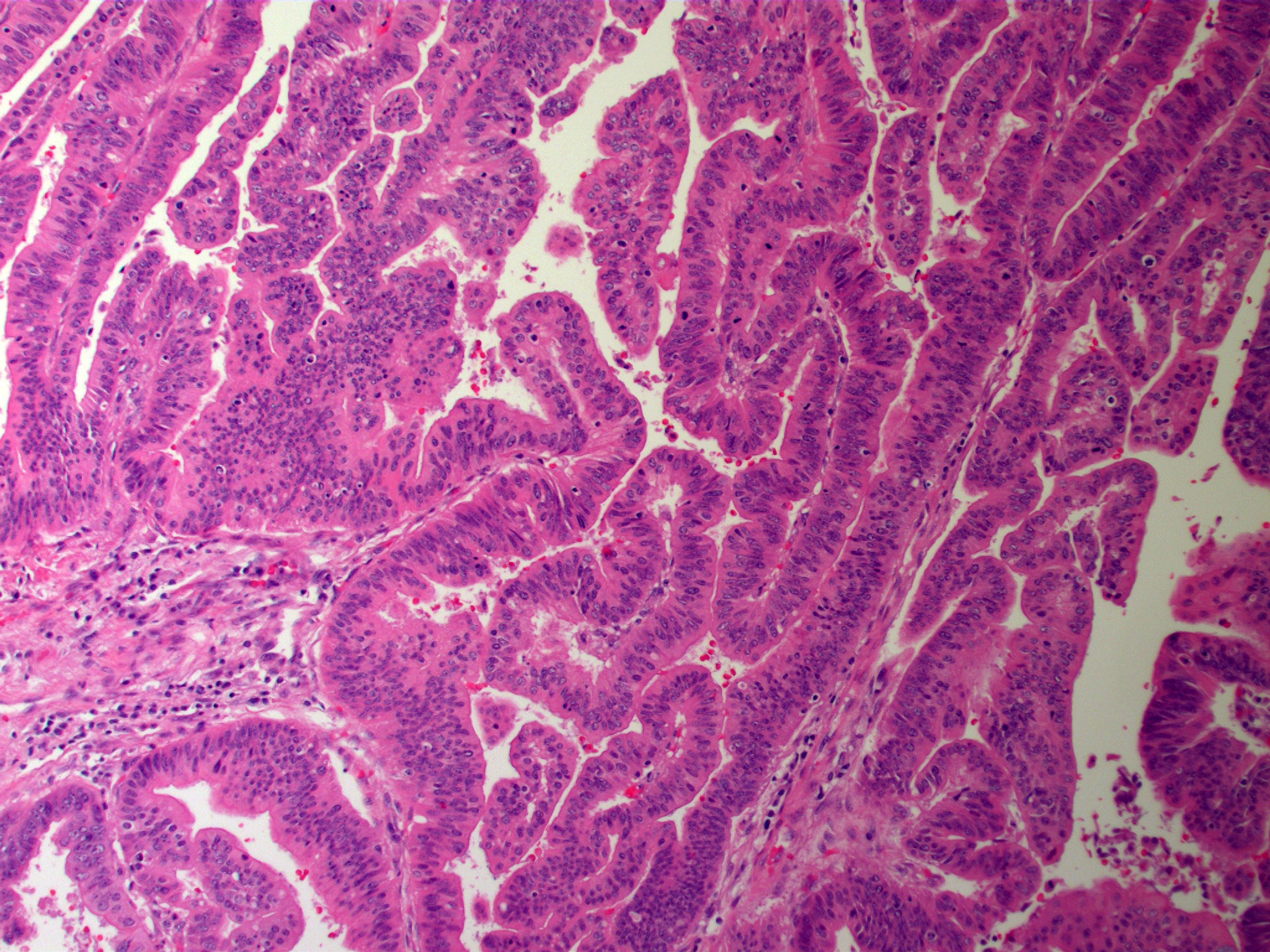
- Specialty: Oncology

Intraductal papillary neoplasm of the bile duct, also known as intraductal papillary biliary neoplasm, is a rare type of liver cancer.
