= Mirizzi's syndrome =

- Specialty: Gastroenterology

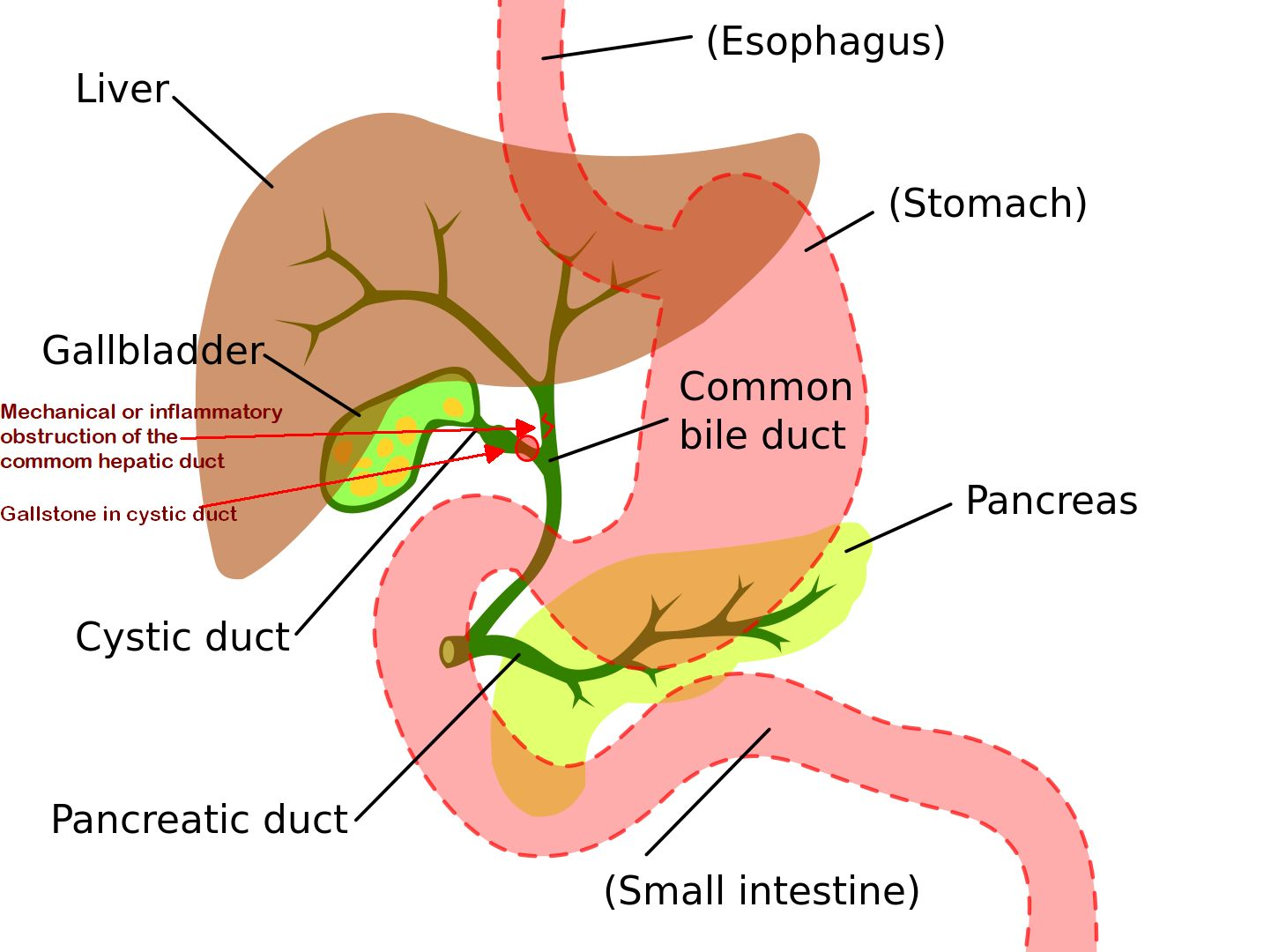
Impacted gallstone in the cystic duct is obstructing the common hepatic duct

Mirizzi's syndrome is a rare complication in which a gallstone becomes impacted in the cystic duct or neck of the gallbladder causing compression of the common hepatic duct, resulting in obstruction and jaundice. The obstructive jaundice can be caused by direct extrinsic compression by the stone or from fibrosis caused by chronic cholecystitis (inflammation). A cholecystocholedochal fistula can occur.

== Presentation ==
Mirizzi's syndrome has no consistent or unique clinical features that distinguish it from other more common forms of obstructive jaundice. Symptoms of recurrent cholangitis, jaundice, right upper quadrant pain, and elevated bilirubin and alkaline phosphatase may or may not be present. Acute presentations of the syndrome include symptoms consistent with cholecystitis.

Surgery is extremely difficult, as Calot's triangle is often obliterated, and the risks of causing injury to the CBD are high, a systematic review of published clinical cases reported that while preoperative recognition is common but less frequent in fistulizing forms, and that anatomical classification and conventional imaging may assist operative planning, but accumulating modalities showed no diagnostic advantage.

== Pathophysiology ==
Multiple and large gallstones can become impacted in the Hartmann's pouch of the gallbladder, leading to chronic inflammation—which leads to compression of the common bile duct (CBD), necrosis, fibrosis, and ultimately fistula formation into the adjacent common hepatic duct (CHD) or common bile duct (CBD). As a result, the CHD/CBD becomes obstructed by either scar or stone, resulting in obstructive jaundice. It can be divided into four types.

Type I – No fistula present

- Type IA – Presence of the cystic duct
- Type IB – Obliteration of the cystic duct

Types II–IV – Fistula present

- Type II – Defect smaller than 33% of the CHD diameter
- Type III – Defect 33–66% of the CHD diameter
- Type IV – Defect larger than 66% of the CHD diameter

== Diagnosis ==
Imaging by ultrasonography, MRCP, or CT scan usually make the diagnosis. MRCP can be used to define the lesion anatomically prior to surgery. Occasionally Mirizzi's syndrome is diagnosed or confirmed on ERCP when requested to alleviate obstructive jaundice or cholangitis by means of an endoscopically placed stent, or when USS has been wrongly reported as choledocolithiasis.

== Treatment ==
Simple cholecystectomy is suitable for type I patients. For types II–IV, subtotal cholecystectomy can be performed to avoid damage to the main bile ducts. Cholecystectomy and bilioenteric anastomosis may be required. Roux-en-Y hepaticojejunostomy has shown good outcome in some studies.

== Epidemiology ==
Mirizzi's syndrome occurs in approximately 0.1% of patients with gallstones. It is found in 0.7 to 2.5 percent of cholecystectomies.It affects males and females equally, but tends to affect older people more often. There is no evidence of ethnicity having any bearing on the epidemiology.

== Eponym ==
It is named for Argentinian physician Pablo Luis Mirizzi (1893–1964). Mirizzi was educated and trained in his hometown and later visited some of the best hospitals throughout the US for further education and training. Mirizzi specialized in abdominal and thoracic surgery and would write prolifically on related surgical topics. In 1931, he performed the first intraoperative cholangiogram. Mirizzi suggested the name of the phenomenon would be "hepatic duct syndrome."
