= Cystic node =

Sentinel lymph node of the gall bladder

Details

Identifiers
- Latin: nodus cysticus, nodus lymphoideus cysticus

The cystic node (also known as the cystic lymph node, cystic lymph node of Lund, Lund's node, or Mascagni's lymph node and often erroneously referred to as Calot's node) is the sentinel lymph node of the gall bladder. It is located within the cystohepatic triangle (Calot's triangle).

== Structure ==
The cystic lymph node is situated at the neck of the gallbladder. It is invariably situated lateral to the biliary tree.

The node receives lymphatic drainage from the gallbladder, cystic duct, hepatic duct, and the superior portion of the common bile duct. It in turn drains lymph into the hepatic lymph nodes.

== Clinical significance ==
It increases in size in cholecystitis and cholangitis; it becomes enlarged in most cases of acute cholecystitis which serendipitously also makes it easier to identify in case of subsequent surgery.

It is an anatomic landmark and may be removed along with the gallbladder in cholecystectomy. The node can be used as a landmark to prevent iatrogenic injury during surgery in the cystohepatic triangle so as to avoid the bile ducts and other structures of the porta hepatis.

== Research ==
According to one retrospective study, the node could be identified in about 78% of patients undergoing laproscopic cholecystectomy; of those in whom the node could be identified, the node was related to the cystic artery in ~97% of cases.

== Etymology ==
The node is named after Fred Bates Lund (1865-1950), an American surgeon. It was also named after the Italian anatomist and physician, Paolo Mascagni (1752-1815), who first identified the node around 1787.
