= Common hepatic duct =

Exocrine duct

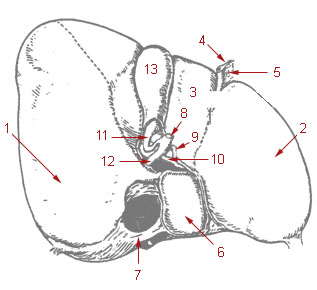
- 1: Right lobe of liver 2: Left lobe of liver 3: Quadrate lobe of liver 4: Round ligament of liver 5: Falciform ligament 6: Caudate lobe of liver 7: Inferior vena cava 8: Common bile duct 9: Hepatic artery 10: Portal vein 11: Cystic duct 12: Common hepatic duct 13: Gallbladder

Details

Identifiers
- Latin: ductus hepaticus communis
- MeSH: D006500
- TA98: A05.8.01.061
- TA2: 3092
- FMA: 14668

1. Bile ducts: 2. Intrahepatic bile ducts; 3. Left and right hepatic ducts; 4. Common hepatic duct; 5. Cystic duct; 6. Common bile duct; 7. Ampulla of Vater; 8. Major duodenal papilla; 9. Gallbladder; 10–11. Right and left lobes of liver: 12. Spleen; 13. Esophagus; 14. Stomach; 15. Pancreas: 16. Accessory pancreatic duct; 17. Pancreatic duct; 18. Small intestine: 19. Duodenum; 20. Jejunum; 21–22. Right and left kidneys The front border of the liver has been lifted up (brown arrow).

The common hepatic duct is the first part of the biliary tract. It joins the cystic duct coming from the gallbladder to form the common bile duct.

== Structure ==
The common hepatic duct is the first part of the biliary tract. It is formed by the union of the right hepatic duct (which drains bile from the right functional lobe of the liver) and the left hepatic duct (which drains bile from the left functional lobe of the liver).

The duct is about 3 cm long. The common hepatic duct is about 6 mm in diameter in adults, with some variation.

=== Termination ===
The common hepatic duct typically unites with the cystic duct some 1–2 cm superior to the duodenum and anterior to the right hepatic artery, with the cystic duct approaching the common hepatic duct from the right.

=== Relations ===
The right branch of the hepatic artery proper usually passes posterior to the duct, but may rarely pass anterior to it instead.

=== Histology ===
The inner surface is covered in a simple columnar epithelium.

=== Variation ===
Accessory hepatic ducts

Around 1.7% of people have additional accessory hepatic ducts that opens into the common hepatic duct. Accessory hepatic ducts may also instead open into the cystic duct or gallbladder.

Termination

Occasionally, the cystic duct may first run along the right side of the common bile duct for some distance before joining it, or may pass posteriorly around to the common hepatic duct to unite with it from the left side.

Rarely, the common hepatic duct and gallbladder join directly (with the cystic duct being absent), leading to illness.

== Function ==
The hepatic duct is part of the biliary tract that transports secretions from the liver into the intestines.

== Clinical significance ==
=== Cholecystectomy ===
The common hepatic ducts carries a higher volume of bile in people who have had their gallbladder removed.

The common hepatic duct is an important anatomic landmark during surgeries such as cholecystectomy. It forms one edge of Calot's triangle, along with the cystic duct and the cystic artery. All constituents of this triangle must be identified to avoid cutting or clipping the wrong structure.

=== Cholestasis ===
A diameter of more than 8 mm is regarded as abnormal dilatation, and is a sign of cholestasis.

=== Mirizzi's syndrome ===
Mirizzi's syndrome occurs when the common hepatic duct is blocked by gallstones.

== Additional images ==
Biliary tract

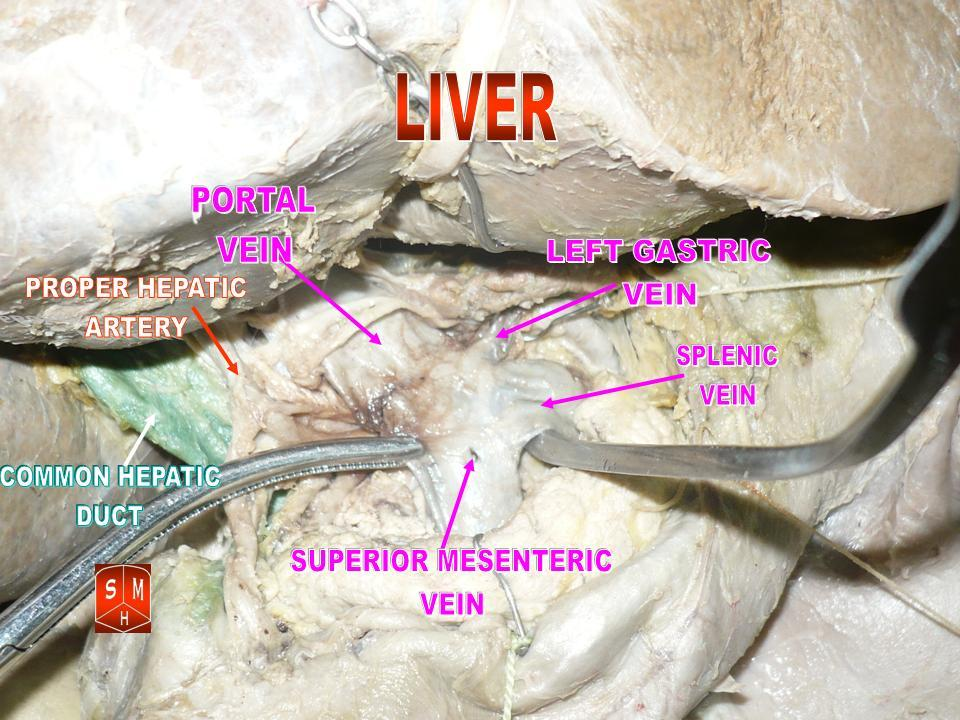
Common hepatic duct

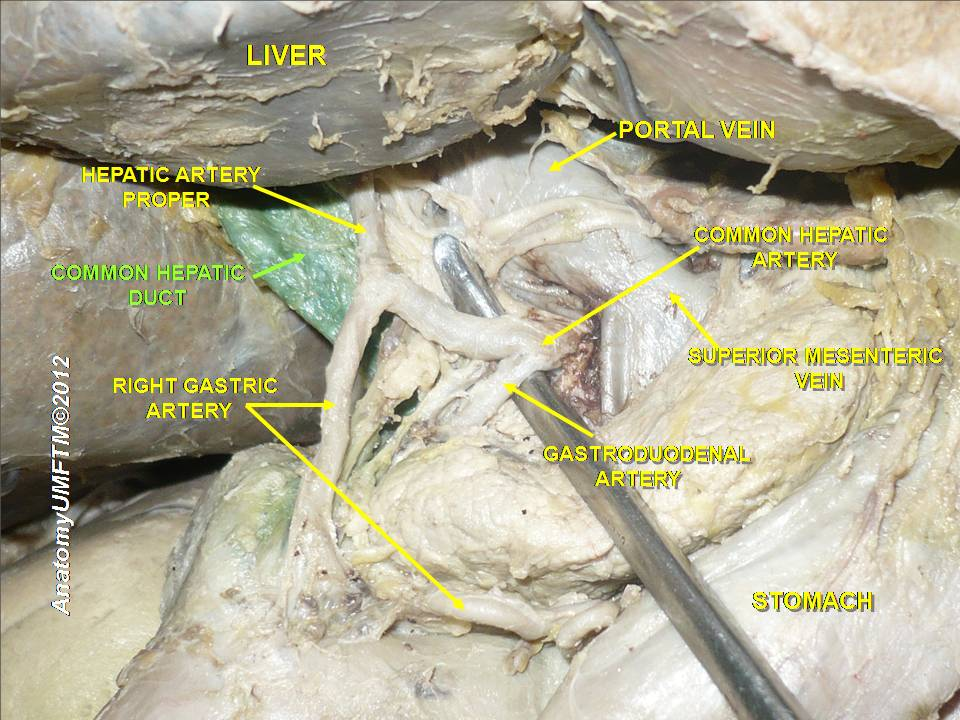
Common hepatic duct

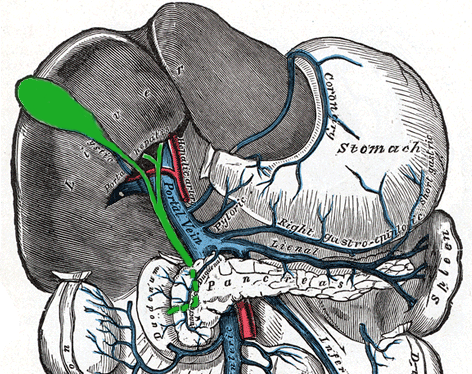
The portal vein and its tributaries

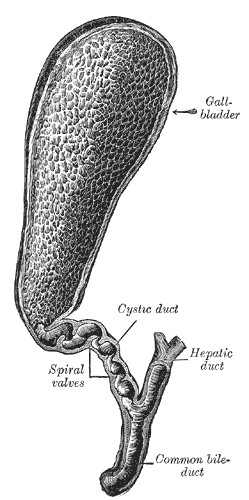
The gall-bladder and bile ducts laid open
