= Retroduodenal arteries =

Artery

Details
- Source: Gastroduodenal artery
- Supplies: Duodenum, bile duct

Identifiers
- Latin: aa. retroduodenales
- TA98: A12.2.12.021
- TA2: 4220
- FMA: 70793

The retroduodenal arteries are several small arteries which usually arise from the gastroduodenal artery posterior to the superior part of duodenum, but may also arise from the posterior superior pancreaticoduodenal artery. They are distributed to the superior part (I) and proximal portion of the descending part (II) of duodenum, as well as the bile duct. The arteries pass anterior to the retroduodenal segmant of the bile duct.
