= Common bile duct =

Gastrointestinal duct

- Diagram of the biliary tree showing the common bile duct

Details
- Part of: Biliary tract

Identifiers
- Latin: ductus choledochus, ductus biliaris
- Acronym: CBD
- MeSH: D003135
- TA98: A05.8.02.013
- TA2: 3103
- FMA: 14667

1. Bile ducts: 2. Intrahepatic bile ducts; 3. Left and right hepatic ducts; 4. Common hepatic duct; 5. Cystic duct; 6. Common bile duct; 7. Ampulla of Vater; 8. Major duodenal papilla; 9. Gallbladder; 10–11. Right and left lobes of liver: 12. Spleen; 13. Esophagus; 14. Stomach; 15. Pancreas: 16. Accessory pancreatic duct; 17. Pancreatic duct; 18. Small intestine: 19. Duodenum; 20. Jejunum; 21–22. Right and left kidneys The front border of the liver has been lifted up (brown arrow).

The common bile duct (also bile duct) is a part of the biliary tract. It is formed by the union of the common hepatic duct and cystic duct. It ends by uniting with the pancreatic duct to form the ampulla of Vater (hepatopancreatic ampulla). Its sphincter, the sphincter of Oddi, enables the regulation of bile flow.

== Anatomy ==
The bile duct is some 6–8 cm long, and normally up to 8 mm in diameter.

Its proximal supraduodenal part is situated within the free edge of the lesser omentum. Its middle retroduodenal part is oriented inferiorly and right-ward, and is situated posterior to the first part of the duodenum, and anterior to the inferior vena cava. Its distal paraduodenal part is oriented still more right-ward, is accommodated by a groove upon (sometimes a channel within) the posterior aspect of the head of the pancreas, and is situated anterior to the right renal vein.

The bile duct terminates by uniting with the pancreatic duct (at an angle of about 60°) to form the Ampulla of Vater (hepatopancreatic ampulla).

The distal extremity of the bile duct invariably features its own sphincter (the pancreatic duct and the Ampulla of Vater usually possess sphincters of their own to allow the flow of pancreatic juice to be regulated independently, however, these two can be absent).

== Clinical significance ==
Several problems can arise within the common bile duct, usually related to its obstruction. Opinions vary slightly on the maximum calibre of a normal CBD, but 6 millimetres (0.24 in) is one accepted upper limit of normal with a further 1mm diameter allowed for each decade over 60 years.

It normally gets slightly dilated after cholecystectomy, with upper limit (95% prediction interval) being about 10 mm after a few months.

On abdominal ultrasonography, the common bile duct is most readily seen in the porta hepatis (where the CBD lies anterior to the portal vein and hepatic artery). The absence of Doppler signal distinguishes it from the portal vein and hepatic artery.

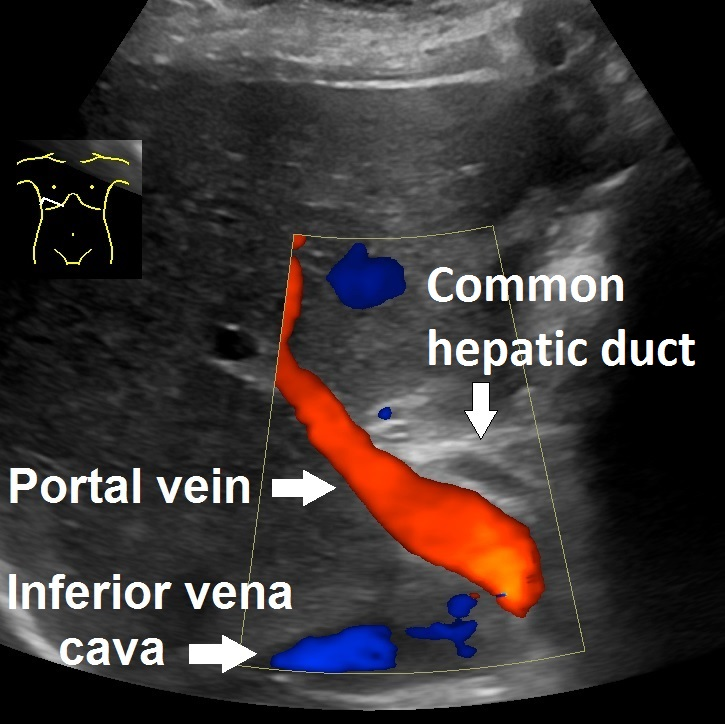
Borderline of a dilated perihilar bile duct, measuring 8 mm.

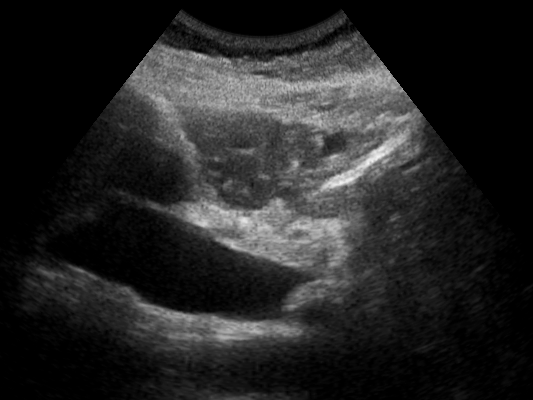
Dilatation of CBD due to an ampullary tumor.

=== Obstruction ===
Tumours in the head of the pancreas may come to obstruct the distal bile duct.

If obstructed by a gallstone, a condition called choledocholithiasis can result. In this obstructed state, the duct is especially vulnerable to an infection called ascending cholangitis. One form of treatment is a cholecystenterostomy. Rare deformities of the common bile duct are cystic dilations (4 cm), choledochoceles (cystic dilation of the ampulla of Vater (3–8 cm)), and biliary atresia.

== History ==
Obstruction of the common bile duct and related jaundice has been documented since at least since the time of Erasistratus.

== Additional images ==
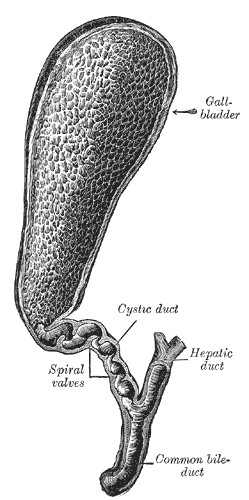
The gall-bladder and bile ducts lay open.

== See also ==
- Choledochoduodenostomy - a surgical procedure to create a connection between the common bile duct (CBD) and an alternative portion of the duodenum.
