= Cystic artery =

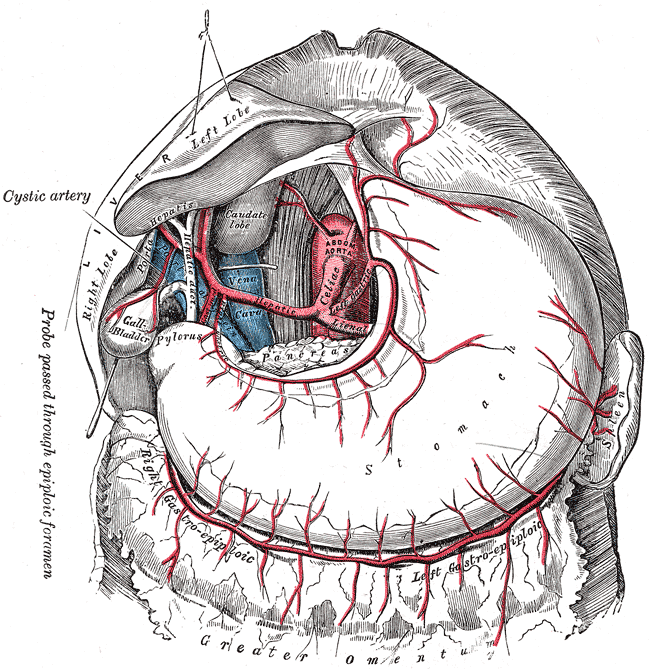
- The cystic artery branches from the right hepatic artery.

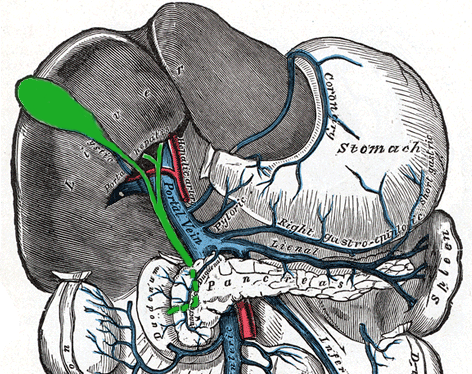
- Relationship to other vessels. (Note that relationships are highly variable -- see below.)

Details
- Source: Right hepatic artery
- Branches: Superior branch Deep branch
- Vein: Cystic vein
- Supplies: Gall bladder and cystic duct

Identifiers
- Latin: arteria cystica
- TA98: A12.2.12.031
- TA2: 4230
- FMA: 14835

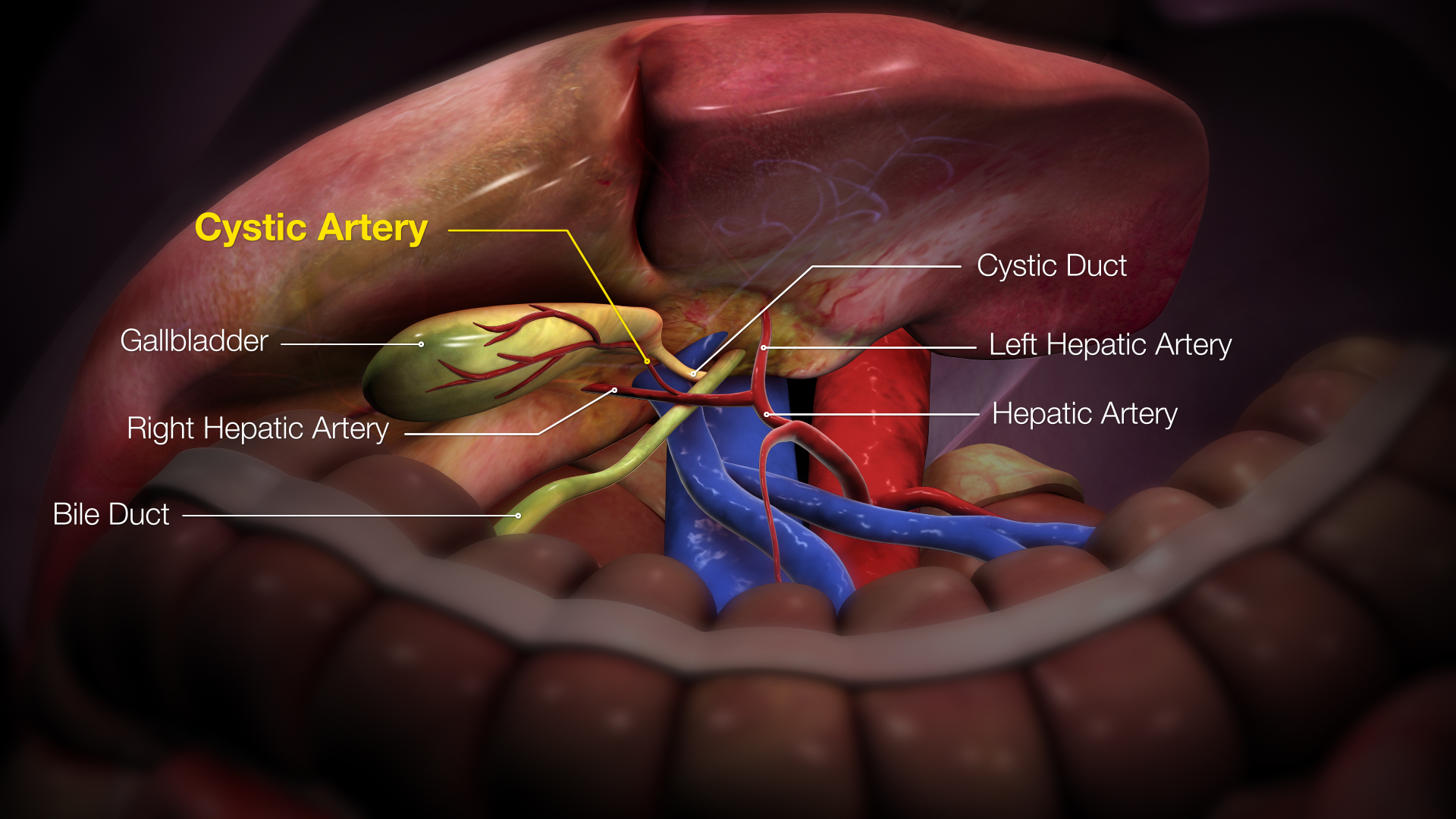
3D medical animation still shot of cystic artery

The cystic artery (also known as bachelor artery) is (usually) a branch of the right hepatic artery that provides arterial supply to the gallbladder and contributes arterial supply to the extrahepatic bile ducts.

== Anatomy ==
The cystic artery usually has a diameter of less than 3mm.

=== Origin ===
The cystic artery arises from the right hepatic artery in about 80% of cases.

=== Course ===
It usually passes posterior to the common hepatic duct within the cystohepatic triangle. Within the triangle, it is usually superior to the cystic duct (if it does not pass superior to the cystic duct, it may be situated outside the triangle).

=== Branches ===
Upon reaching the superior aspect of the neck of the gallbladder, it splits into superficial and deep branches. These branches then form an anastomotic network over the surface of the body and fundus of the gallbladder.

It produces 2 to 4 minor branches (known as Calot’s arteries) that supply part of the cystic duct and cervix of the gallbladder before dividing into the major superficial and deep branches at the superior aspect of the gallbladder neck:

- The superficial branch (or anterior branch) passes subserously over the left aspect of the gallbladder.
- The deep branch (or posterior branch) runs between the gallbladder and gallbladder fossa, terminating at the peritoneum attached to the liver surface.

The cystic artery additionally emits fine branches that contribute to the arterial supply of the extrahepatic bile ducts.

=== Variation ===
In the classic arrangement, occurring with a frequency of approximately 70%, a singular cystic artery originates from the geniculate flexure of the right hepatic artery in the upper portion of the hepatobiliary triangle. A site of origin from a more proximal or distal portion of the right hepatic artery is also considered relatively normal.

==== Double cystic artery ====
When superficial and deep branches of the cystic artery do not share a common origin, it is defined as a double cystic artery occurring with a frequency of 15%.

The deep branch consistently arises from the right hepatic artery which is generally also the source of origin of the superficial branch, however in some cases it has been found to initiate from the anterior segmental artery, middle hepatic artery, left hepatic artery, superior mesenteric artery, gastroduodenal artery or retroduodenal artery.

Approximately half of superficial cystic arteries have been shown to enter through the hepatobiliary triangle, while deep cystic arteries are often quite small in length and diameter. Tripling of the cystic artery is very rare, occurring in between 0-0.3% of cases.

==== Aberrant origin of the right hepatic artery ====
Unusual anatomy of the right hepatic can itself affect the path and form of the cystic artery, with the most frequent variation resulting from an aberrant origin of the right hepatic artery which is described in between 2-16% of cases.

Generally, this anomalous source is the superior mesenteric artery or more rarely the abdominal aorta, producing what has been described as a "replacing right hepatic artery", passing through the hepatobiliary triangle and running posterior and parallel to the cystic duct.

Because of the close proximity to the gallbladder to the (replacing) right hepatic artery, a "caterpillar" or "Moynihan's" hump may form and this artery generally produces multiple short cystic branches rather than a single cystic artery.

==== Left hepatic artery ====
The cystic artery can arise from the left hepatic artery, in which case it usually travels through a passage of liver parenchyma, approaching the neck of the gallbladder, before bifurcating into ascending (or superior) and descending (or inferior) branches. This arrangement is found in roughly 1% of cases.

This form of the cystic artery does not pass through the hepatobiliary triangle and has been found located both anteriorly and posteriorly to the common hepatic duct.

==== Recurrent cystic artery ====
In less than 1% of patients, a form known as a recurrent cystic artery is found – the cystic artery arises from the left hepatic artery and passes through either the cholecystoduodenal or cholecystocolic ligaments (connecting the gallbladder to the duodenum and transverse colon respectively), follows the right edge of the hepatoduodenal ligament, and connects to the fundus of the gallbladder before descending to supply the body and neck.

==== Low-lying cystic artery ====
When a single cystic artery arises from gastroduodenal artery it forms a configuration known as low-lying cystic artery, as it passes inferior to the cystic duct through the cholecystoduodenal ligament, and therefore remains outside the hepatobiliary triangle.

This condition has alternatively been described as an inferior cystic artery and transposition of the cystic artery and duct with a prevalence at approximately 5%.

In 25% of these patients with this course, there will be a secondary arterial supply to the gallbladder, with the low-lying artery acting as the equivalent of the posterior branch.

== Clinical significance ==
It must be identified and ligated in operations that remove the gallbladder (cholecystectomies).
