= Hepatic artery proper =

Artery supplying blood to the liver and gallbladder

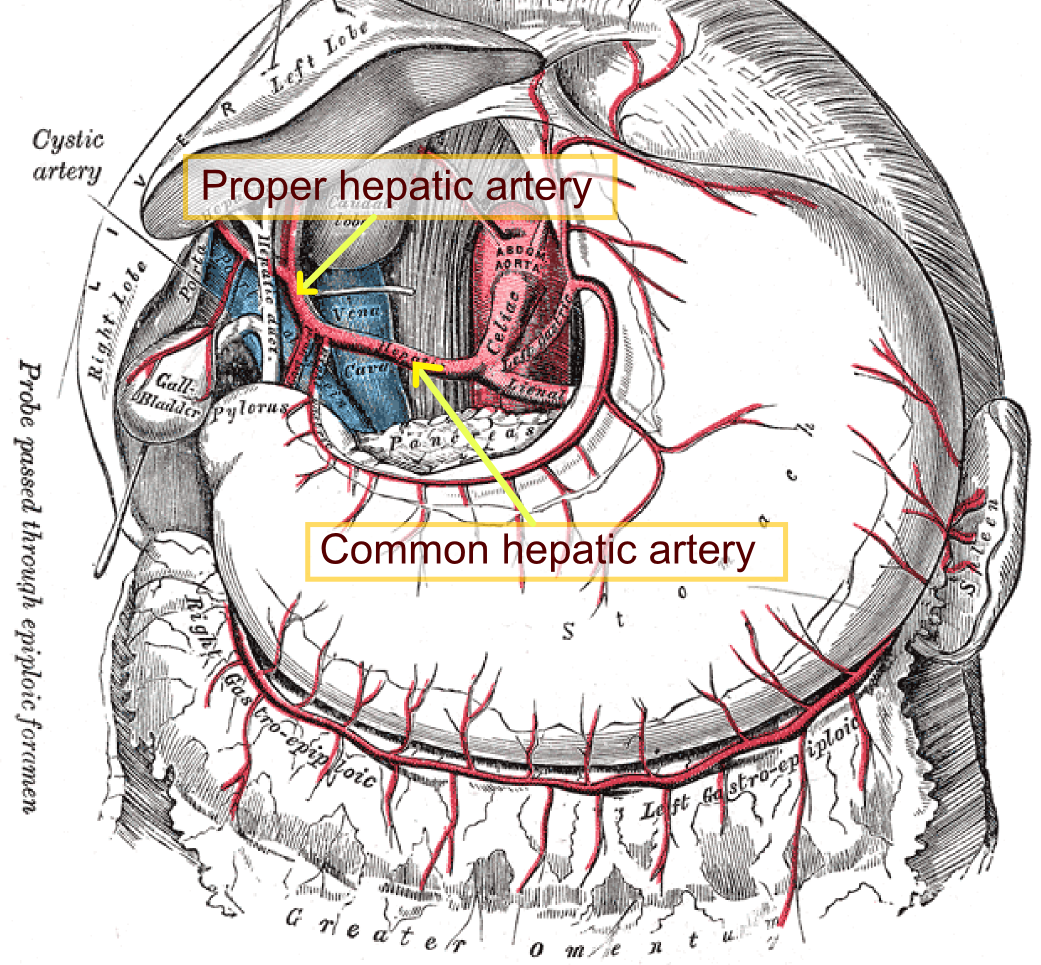
- The hepatic artery proper branches from the common hepatic artery.

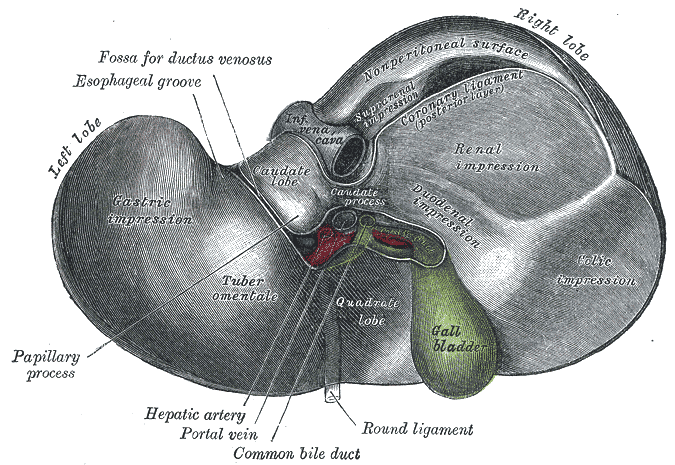
- Inferior surface of the liver. (Entrance for hepatic artery labeled at bottom center.)

Details
- Source: Common hepatic artery

Identifiers
- Latin: arteria hepatica propria
- TA98: A12.2.12.029
- TA2: 4227
- FMA: 14772

The hepatic artery proper (also proper hepatic artery) is the artery that supplies the liver and gallbladder. It raises from the common hepatic artery, a branch of the celiac artery.

The HAP accounts for 10% of hepatic blood flow and 30% of its oxygen supply, with the rest provided by the portal vein; this double blood supply makes the liver far more resilient to vascular disease than other major organs.

== Structure ==
The hepatic artery proper arises from the common hepatic artery and runs alongside the portal vein and the common bile duct to form the portal triad. A branch of the common hepatic artery – the gastroduodenal artery – gives off the small supraduodenal artery to the duodenal bulb. Then the right gastric artery comes off and runs to the left along the lesser curvature of the stomach to meet the left gastric artery, which is a branch of the celiac trunk. It subsequently bifurcates into the right and left hepatic arteries.

=== Variant anatomy ===
Of note, the right and left hepatic arteries may demonstrate variant anatomy. A misplaced right hepatic artery may arise from the superior mesenteric artery (SMA) and a misplaced left hepatic artery may arise from the left gastric artery. The cystic artery generally comes from the right hepatic artery.

Other variants of right hepatic artery includes: arising directly from the proximal or middle part of common hepatic artery, gastroduodenal artery, superior mesenteric artery, celiac axis, aorta, splenic artery, or left gastric artery instead of arising from proper hepatic artery.

== Additional images ==
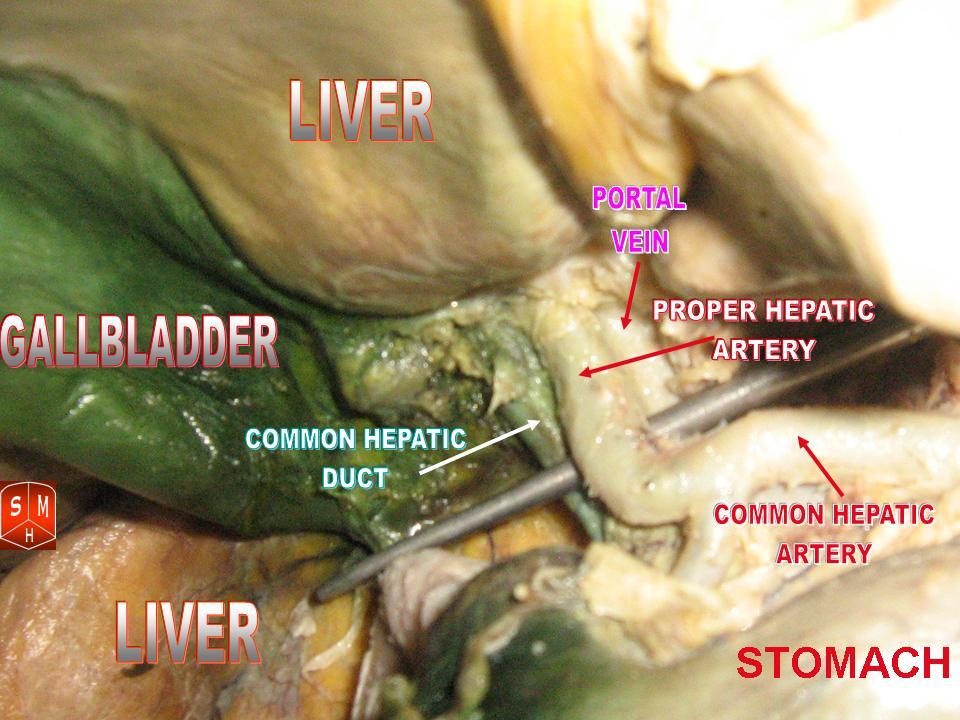
Proper hepatic artery

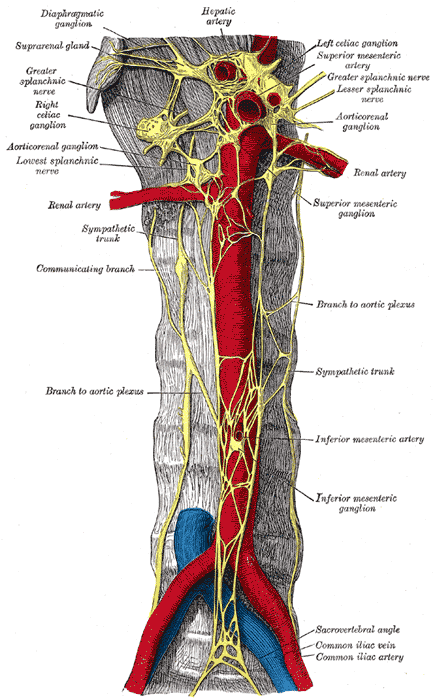
Abdominal portion of the sympathetic trunk, with the celiac and hypogastric plexuses.

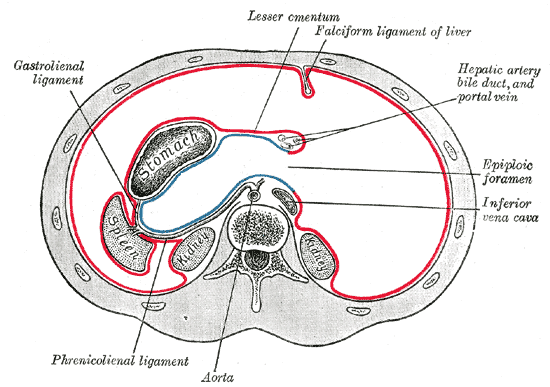
Horizontal disposition of the peritoneum in the upper part of the abdomen.

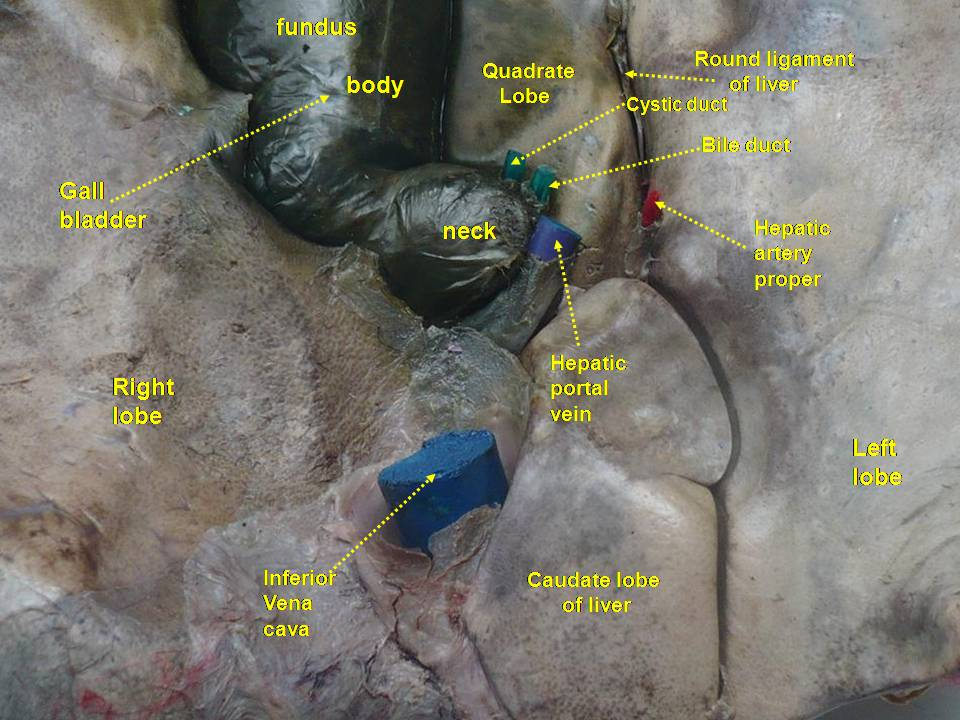
Hepatic artery proper. Visceral surface of liver.
