= Cystic duct =

Organ duct

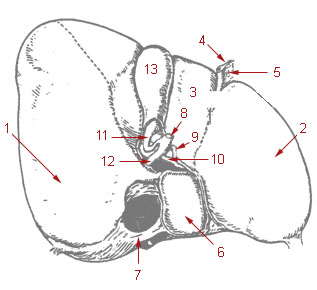
- 1: Right lobe of liver 2: Left lobe of liver 3: Quadrate lobe of liver 4: Round ligament of liver 5: Falciform ligament 6: Caudate lobe of liver 7: Inferior vena cava 8: Common bile duct 9: Hepatic artery 10: Portal vein 11: Cystic duct 12: Hepatic duct 13: Gallbladder

Details
- Artery: cystic artery

Identifiers
- Latin: ductus cysticus
- MeSH: D003549
- TA98: A05.8.02.011
- TA2: 3101
- FMA: 14539

1. Bile ducts: 2. Intrahepatic bile ducts; 3. Left and right hepatic ducts; 4. Common hepatic duct; 5. Cystic duct; 6. Common bile duct; 7. Ampulla of Vater; 8. Major duodenal papilla; 9. Gallbladder; 10–11. Right and left lobes of liver: 12. Spleen; 13. Esophagus; 14. Stomach; 15. Pancreas: 16. Accessory pancreatic duct; 17. Pancreatic duct; 18. Small intestine: 19. Duodenum; 20. Jejunum; 21–22. Right and left kidneys The front border of the liver has been lifted up (brown arrow).

The cystic duct is the duct that (typically) joins the gallbladder and the common hepatic duct; the union of the cystic duct and common hepatic duct forms the bile duct (formerly known as the common bile duct). Its length varies.

== Anatomy ==
The cystic duct typically measures (sources differ) 2–4 cm/2–3 cm in length (though its length has been known to range from 0.5 cm to 9 cm), and 2–3 mm in diameter. It is often tortuous.

It is the distal continuation of the neck of the gallbladder, from where it is directed inferoposteriorly and to the left/medially (this occurs in half of individuals). It typically terminates by uniting with the common hepatic duct to form the bile duct (usually anterior to the right hepatic artery). It usually joins the common bile duct from the right lateral side (forming an oblique angle between the two), and at such a distance that the bile duct is twice as long as the common hepatic duct. It often fuses with the common hepatic duct before actually opening into it after a variable distance (this arrangement may have the purpose of directing bile flow distally instead of back towards the liver).

=== Structure ===
The inner surface of the cystic duct features spiral, crescentic mucosal folds - the spiral folds of cystic duct.

The inner surface of the proximal cystic duct exhibits a network of submicroscopic convoluted folds (rugae), whereas that of the distal cystic duct exhibits submicroscopic parallel longitudinal folds.

=== Histology ===
The epithelial lining of the inner surface of the duct is similar to that of the gallbladder and consists mostly of columnar epithelial cells with short microvilli upon their apical surfaces.

The subepithelial layer consists of elastic connective tissue and is highly vascular; vessels that are adjacent to the epithelial basement membrane are fenestrated, possibly to facilitate ion and fluid exchange with the bile as is the case in the gallbladder itself.

The outer fibromuscular layer contains smooth muscle continuous with that of the gallbladder; some of the smooth muscle extends into the spiral valves.

=== Relations ===
It usually lies next to the cystic artery.

=== Variation ===
The cystic duct may rarely be doubled.

An accessory hepatic duct may join the cystic duct.

A pathological diverticulum known as the Hartmann’s pouch may be present at the junction of the neck of bladder and the cystic duct.

Length

The duct may sometimes be extremely short (making cholecystectomy risky) or may rarely be altogether absent (so that the gallbladder is directly attached to the bile duct).

Shape

While most often tortuous, it may occasionally be curved, straight, or S-shaped.

Termination

The cystic duct may unite with the common hepatic duct so that the common hepatic duct is either very short or very long (and the bile duct in turn very long or very short, respectively), or it may instead unite with the a hepatic duct.

Occasionally, the cystic duct may first run alongside the common hepatic duct for some distance within the hepatoduodenal ligament before joining it. It sometimes join the common hepatic duct at its anterior, posterior, or medial side (in the latter case by passing posteriorly around the common bile duct to join it from the other side). It may spiral around the common hepatic duct before joining it.

Very rarely, the cystic duct opens into the duodenum.

== Function ==
Bile can flow in either direction between the gallbladder, and the common bile duct and hepatic duct. In this way, bile is stored in the gallbladder in between meal times. The hormone cholecystokinin, when stimulated by a fatty meal, promotes bile secretion by increased production of hepatic bile, contraction of the gall bladder, and relaxation of the Sphincter of Oddi.

The bile duct was once thought to possess a sphincteric function, however, it is now known that bile flow through the cystic duct proceeds unimpeded and is instead regulated by other mechanisms at other points of the biliary system.

== Clinical significance ==
Gallstones can enter and obstruct the cystic duct, preventing the flow of bile. The increased pressure in the gallbladder leads to swelling and pain. This pain, known as biliary colic, is sometimes referred to as a gallbladder "attack" because of its sudden onset.

During a cholecystectomy, the cystic duct is clipped two or three times and a cut is made between the clips, freeing the gallbladder to be taken out.

== See also ==
- Accessory bile duct

== Additional images ==
Digestive system diagram showing the cystic duct

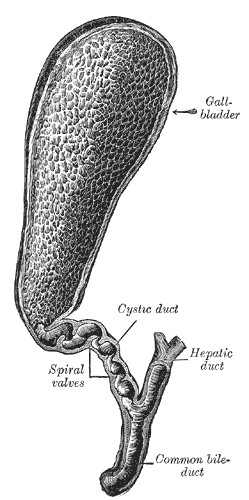
The gall-bladder and bile ducts laid open.

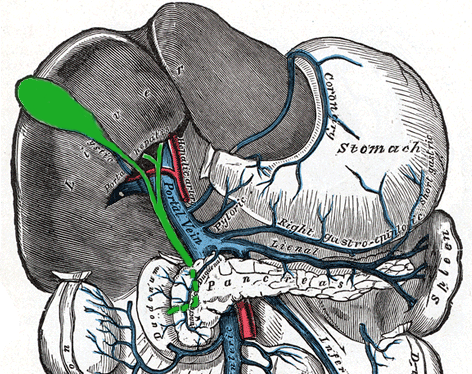
The portal vein and its tributaries.

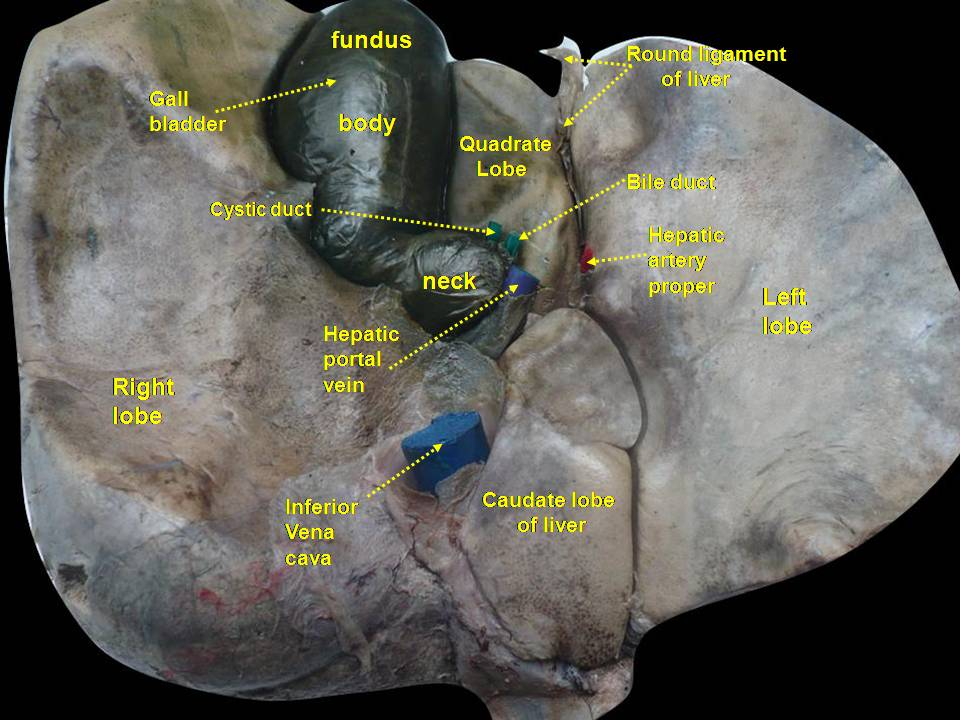
Cystic duct.Visceral surface of liver.
