= Common hepatic artery =

Artery

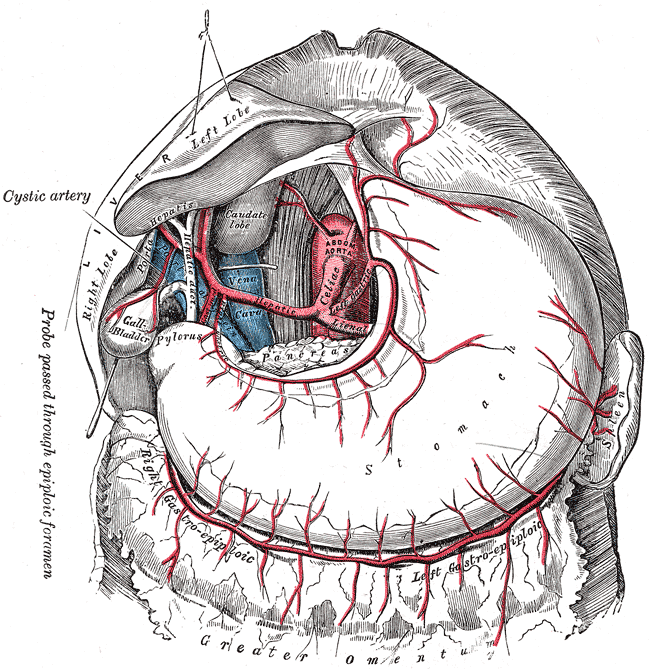
- Branches of the celiac artery - stomach in situ. (Hepatic artery is visible at upper left.)

- 3D-rendered computed tomography, showing common hepatic artery in center

Details
- Source: Celiac artery
- Branches: Hepatic artery proper gastroduodenal artery

Identifiers
- Latin: arteria hepatica communis
- MeSH: D006499
- TA98: A12.2.12.015
- TA2: 4214
- FMA: 14771

The common hepatic artery is a short blood vessel that supplies oxygenated blood to the liver, pylorus of the stomach, duodenum, pancreas, and gallbladder.

It arises from the celiac artery and has the following branches:

| Branch | Details |
|---|---|
| hepatic artery proper | supplies the gallbladder via the cystic artery and the liver via the left and right hepatic arteries |
| gastroduodenal artery | branches into the right gastroepiploic artery and superior pancreaticoduodenal artery |
| right gastric artery | branches to supply the lesser curvature of the stomach inferiorly |

== Additional images ==
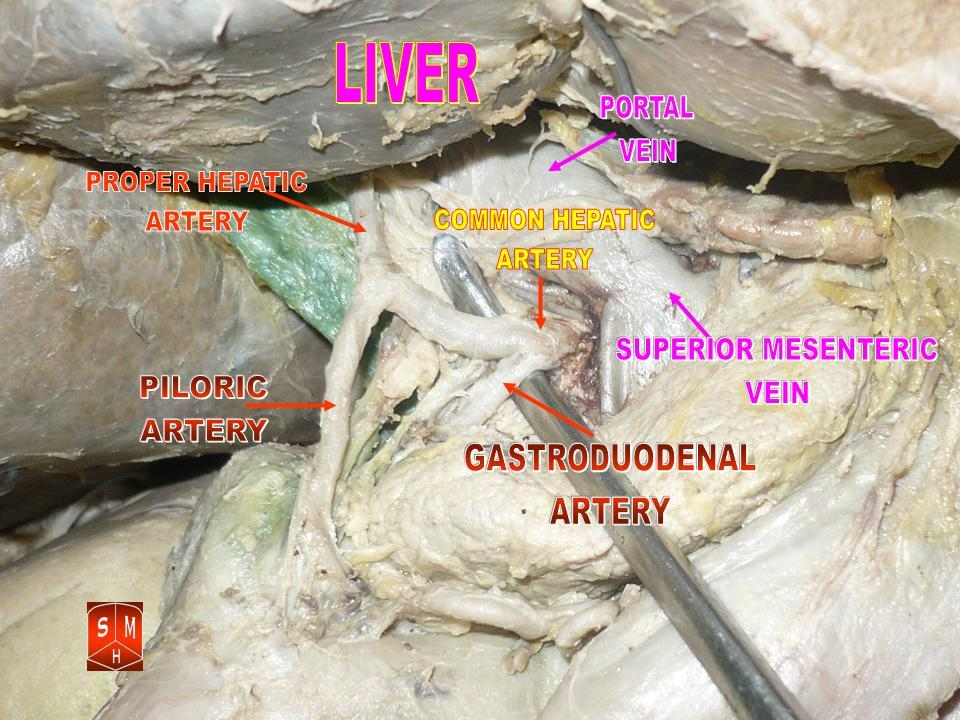
Common hepatic artery and its branches including hepatic artery proper and right gastric artery (pyloric artery)
