= Liver segment =

Anatomical unit of the liver

- Shape of human liver in animation. Eight segments by Couinaud labelled.

Details
- Part of: Liver

A liver segment is one of eight segments of the liver as described in the widely used Couinaud classification (named after Claude Couinaud) in the anatomy of the liver. This system divides the lobes of the liver into eight segments based on a transverse plane through the bifurcation of the main portal vein, arranged in a clockwise manner starting from the caudate lobe.

== Couinaud segments ==
Couinaud classification system

There are four lobes of the liver. The Couinaud classification of liver anatomy then further divides the liver into eight functionally independent segments. Each segment has its own vascular inflow, outflow and biliary drainage. In the centre of each segment there is a branch of the portal vein, hepatic artery and bile duct. In the periphery of each segment there is vascular outflow through the hepatic veins. The division of the liver into independent units means that segments can be resected without damaging the remaining segments. To preserve the viability of the liver following surgery, resections follow the vessels defining the peripheries of each segment. This means that resection lines parallel the hepatic veins, leaving the portal veins, bile ducts, and hepatic arteries intact.

The classification system uses the vascular supply in the liver to separate the functional segments (numbered I to VIII)

=== Caudate lobe ===
Segment I is the caudate lobe and is situated posteriorly. It may receive its supply from both the right and the left branches of portal vein. It contains one or more hepatic veins which drain directly into the inferior vena cava (IVC).

The caudate lobe is a separate structure which receives blood flow from both the right- and left-sided vascular branches.

The Caudate lobe includes: (1) the Spiegel lobe; (2) the paracaval portion; and (3) the caudate process portion. The Spiegel lobe has its portal venous and biliary branches ramified mainly from the left-side tract. The Paracaval portion has the portal venous branches ramified mainly from the left portal vein, while the biliary branches of this portion drained into the right and left biliary tracts at almost equal frequencies. The portal venous branches & Biliary branches of the caudate process portion has it ramified from the right-side tract.

=== Left lobe ===
Segments II and III lie medial to the falciform ligament with II superior to the portal venous supply and III inferior. Segment IV lies lateral to the falciform ligament and is subdivided into IVa (superior) and IVb (inferior).

=== Right lobe ===
Segments V to VIII make up the right part of the liver:

- Segment V is the most medial and inferior
- Segment VI is located more posteriorly
- Segment VII is located above segment VI
- Segment VIII sits above segment V in the superior-medial position

=== Quadrate lobe ===
The fissure for the round ligament of the liver (ligamentum teres) separates the medial and lateral parts of segment IV. The inferior medial segment (IVb) is also called the quadrate lobe.

== Society ==
The clockwise numbering of liver segments in Couinaud's classification is said to have been inspired by the numbering of arrondissements (administrative districts) of Paris.
