= Lobules of liver =

Microscopic anatomical divisions of the liver

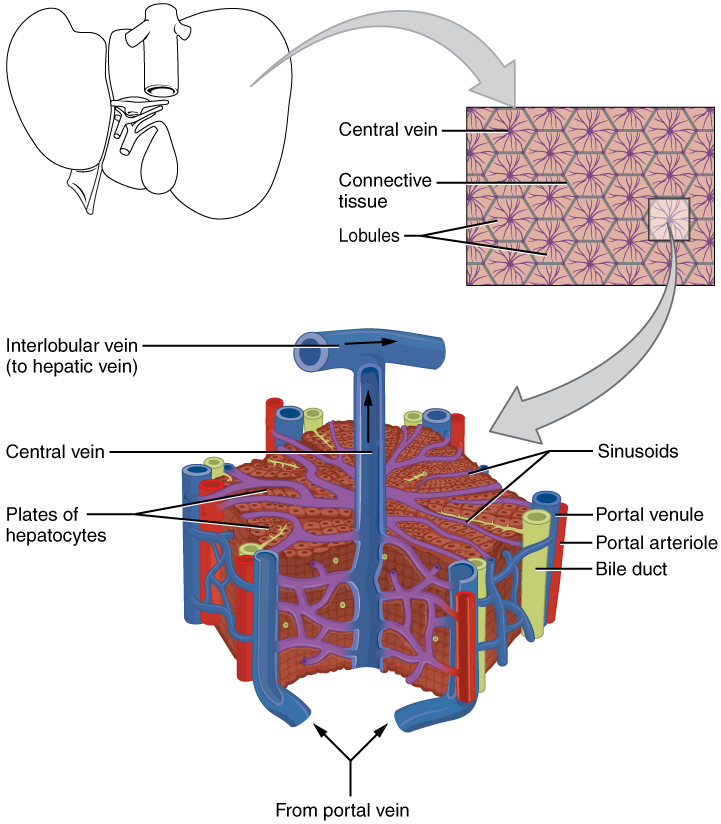
- The structure of the liver’s functional units or lobules. Blood enters the lobules through branches of the portal vein and hepatic artery proper.

Details
- System: Digestive system
- Location: Liver

Identifiers
- Latin: lobuli hepatis
- TA98: A05.8.01.056
- TA2: 3060
- FMA: 76488

In histology (microscopic anatomy), the lobules of liver, or hepatic lobules, are small divisions of the liver defined at the microscopic scale. The hepatic lobule is a building block of the liver tissue, consisting of portal triads, hepatocytes arranged in linear cords between a capillary network, and a central vein.

Lobules are different from the lobes of liver: they are the smaller divisions of the lobes. The two-dimensional microarchitecture of the liver can be viewed from different perspectives:

Name	Shape	Model
classical lobule	hexagonal; divided into concentric centrilobular, midzonal, periportal parts	anatomical
portal lobule	triangular; centered on a portal triad	bile secretion
acinus	elliptical or diamond-shaped; divided into zone I (periportal), zone II (transition zone), and zone III (pericentral)	blood flow and metabolic

The term "hepatic lobule", without qualification, typically refers to the classical lobule.

== Structure ==
The hepatic lobule can be described in terms of metabolic "zones", describing the hepatic acinus (terminal acinus). Each zone is centered on the line connecting two portal triads and extends outwards to the two adjacent central veins. The periportal zone I is nearest to the entering vascular supply and receives the most oxygenated blood, making it least sensitive to ischemic injury while making it very susceptible to viral hepatitis. Conversely, the centrilobular zone III has the poorest oxygenation, and will be most affected during a time of ischemia.

=== Portal triad ===
A portal triad (also known as portal canal, portal field, portal area, or portal tract) is a distinctive arrangement within lobules. It consists of the following five structures:

- proper hepatic artery, an arteriole branch of the hepatic artery that supplies oxygen
- hepatic portal vein, a venule branch of the portal vein, with blood rich in nutrients but low in oxygen
- one or two small bile ductules of cuboidal epithelium, branches of the bile conducting system.
- lymphatic vessels
- branch of the vagus nerve

The misnomer "portal triad" traditionally has included only the first three structures, and was named before lymphatic vessels were discovered in the structure. It can refer both to the largest branch of each of these vessels running inside the hepatoduodenal ligament, and to the smaller branches of these vessels inside the liver.

In the smaller portal triads, the four vessels lie in a network of connective tissue and are surrounded on all sides by hepatocytes. The ring of hepatocytes abutting the connective tissue of the triad is called the periportal limiting plate.

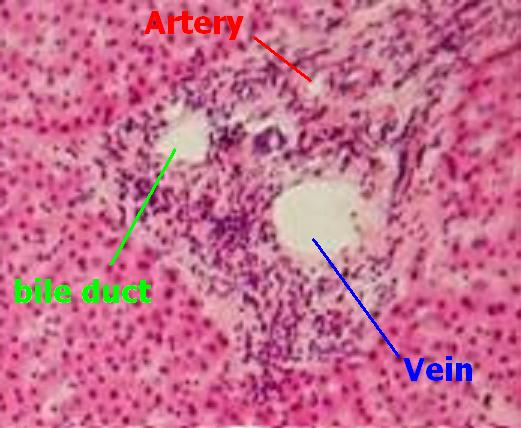
Portal triad

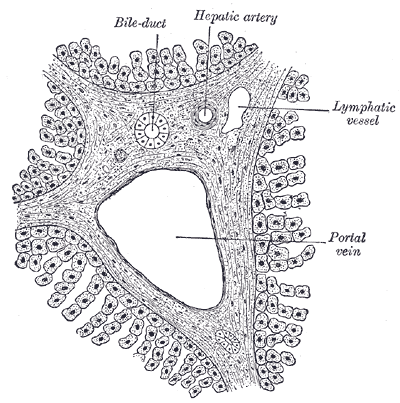
Labeled sketch of a portal canal

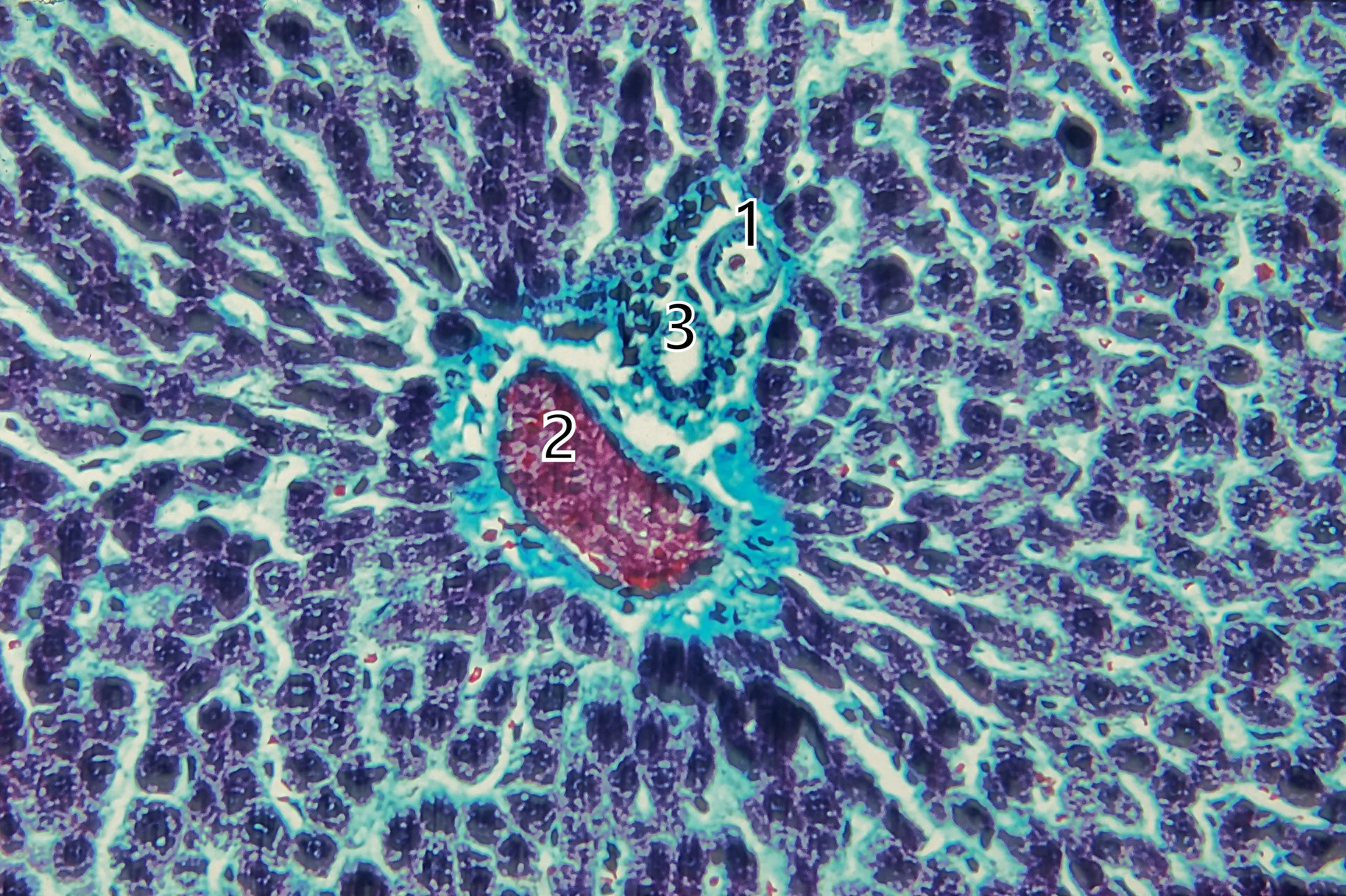
Portal triad of a rat liver, 1 branch of hepatic artery, 2 branch of portal vein, 3 bile duct

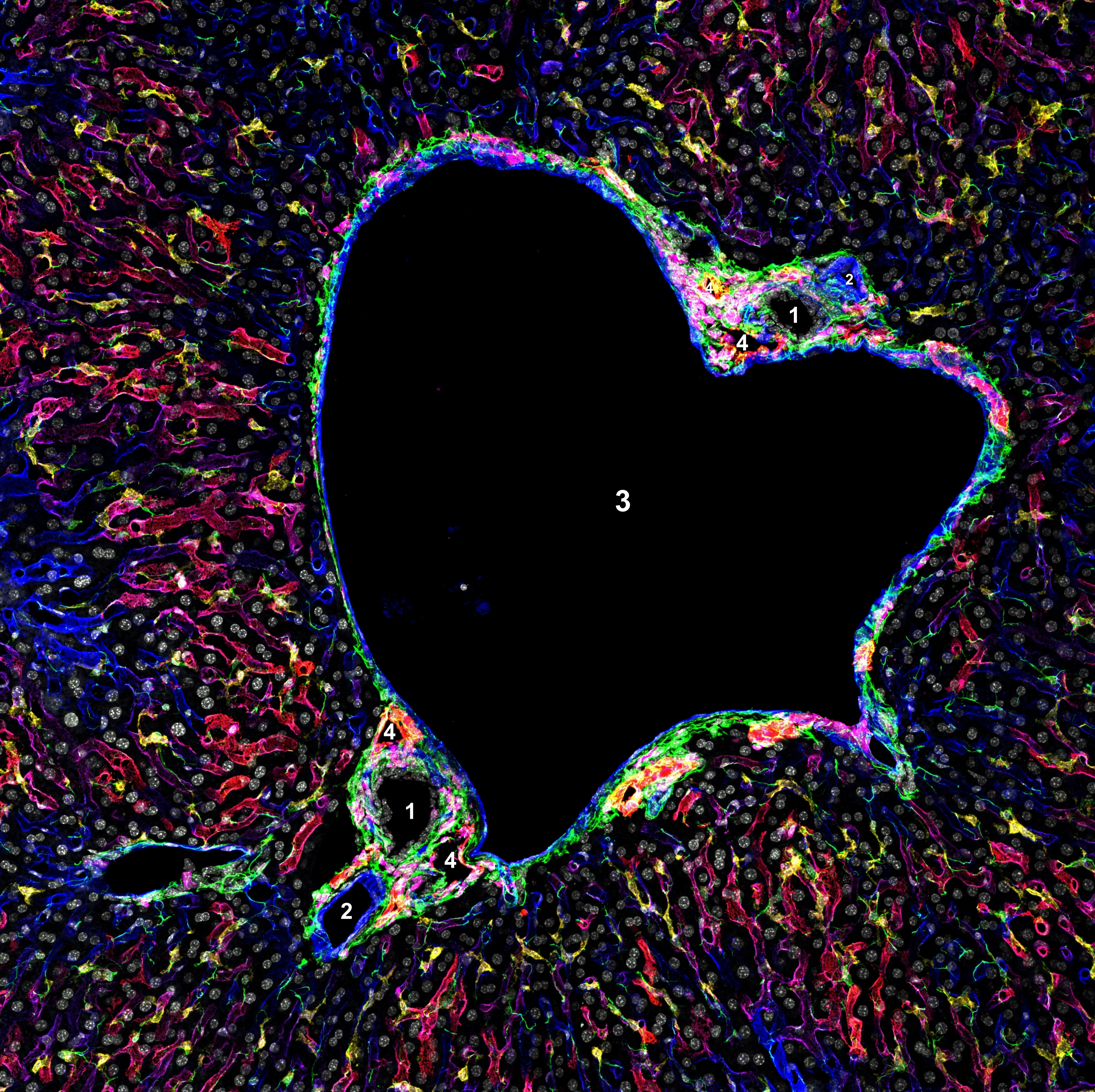
Portal triad of mouse liver. 1= bile duct, 2= branch of hepatic artery, 3= branch of portal vein, 4= lymphatic vessels

=== Periportal space ===
The periportal space (Latin: spatium periportale), or periportal space of Mall, is a space between the stroma of the portal canal and the outermost hepatocytes in the hepatic lobule, and is thought to be one of the sites where lymph originates in the liver.

Fluid (residual blood plasma) that is not taken up by hepatocytes drains into the periportal space, and is taken up by the lymphatic vessels that accompany the other portal triad constituents.

== Function ==
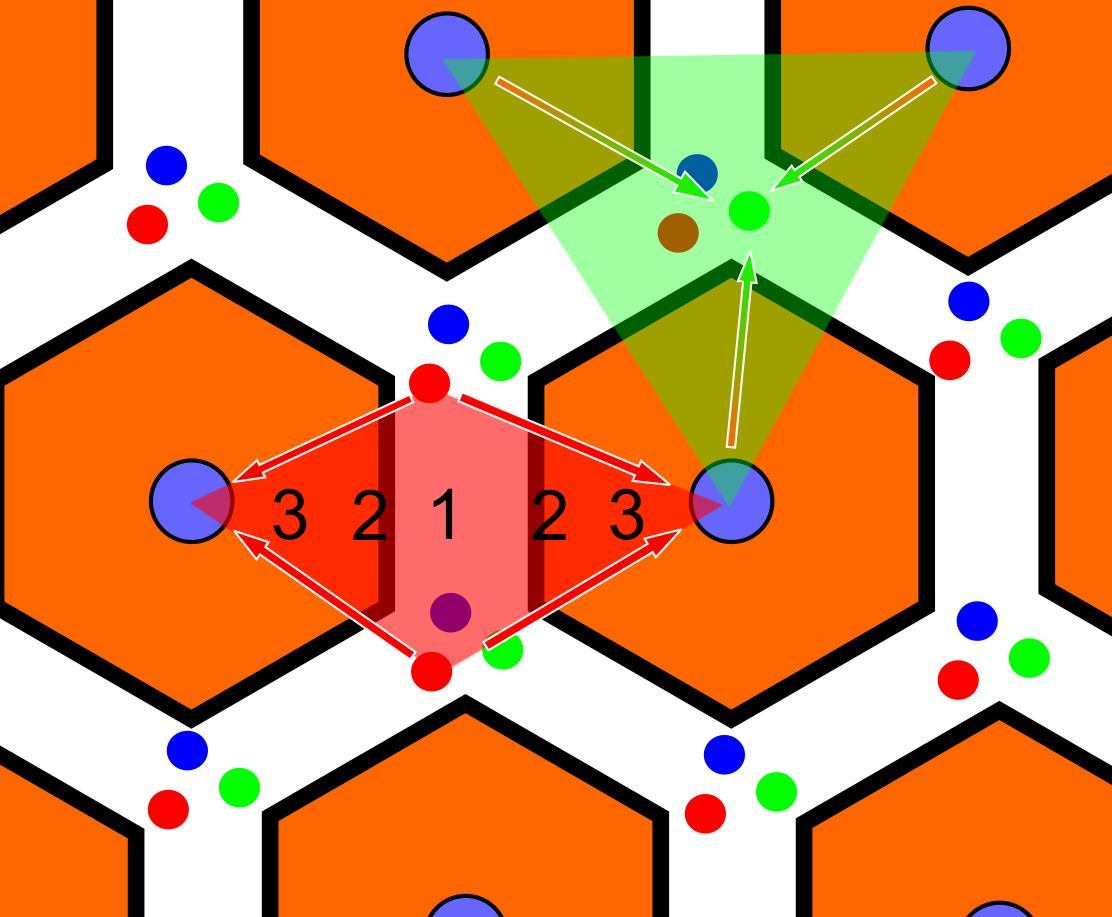
Oxygenation zones are numbered inside the diamond-shaped acinus (in red). Zone three is closest to the central vein and zone one is closest to the portal triad

Zones differ by function:

- zone I hepatocytes are specialized for oxidative liver functions such as gluconeogenesis, β-oxidation of fatty acids and cholesterol synthesis
- zone III cells are more important for glycolysis, lipogenesis and cytochrome P-450-based drug detoxification. This specialization is reflected histologically; the detoxifying zone III cells have the highest concentration of CYP2E1 and thus are most sensitive to NAPQI production in acetaminophen toxicity.

Other zonal injury patterns include zone I deposition of hemosiderin in hemochromatosis and zone II necrosis in yellow fever.

== Clinical significance ==
Bridging fibrosis, a type of fibrosis seen in several types of liver injury, describes fibrosis from the central vein to the portal triad.

== See also ==
- Porta hepatis
