= Cantlie line =

Anatomical line dividing the liver

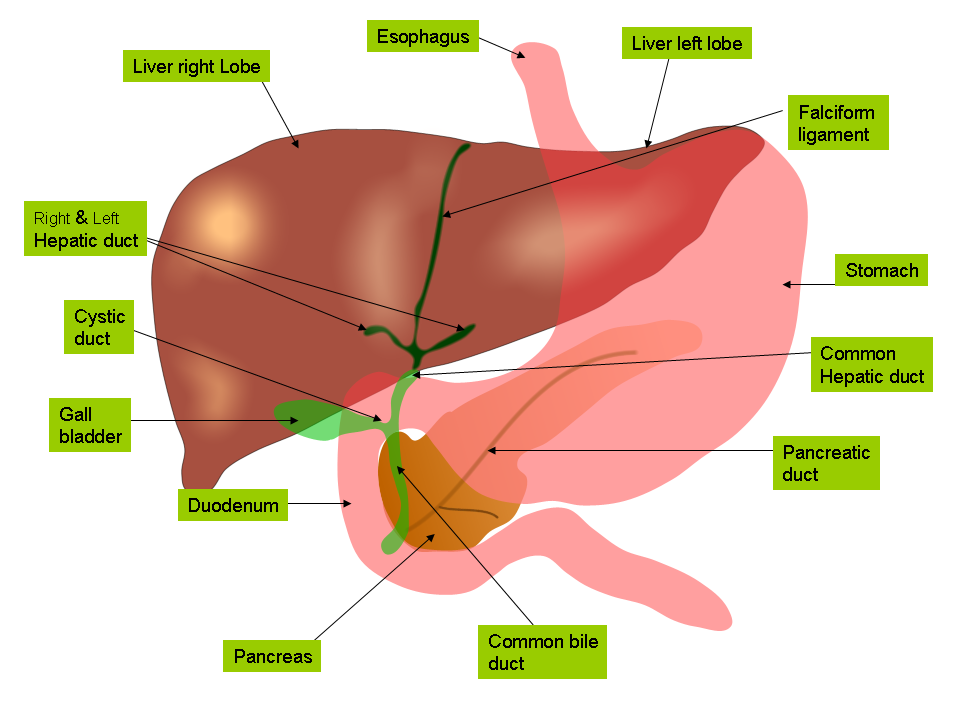

Details
- Part of: Liver

In human anatomy, the Cantlie line or Cantlie's line is an imaginary division of the liver. The division divides the liver into two planes, extending from the middle hepatic vein to the middle of the gallbladder. It is useful for performing hepatectomies.

== Structure ==
The division divides the liver into two planes. It extends from the middle hepatic vein (or the inferior vena cava) to the middle of the gallbladder.

Using Couinaud's classification system, segments two, three, and both parts of four are on the left side of the division, while segments five, six, seven, and eight are on the right.

== Clinical significance ==
Cantlie's line is useful when performing hepatectomies.

== History ==
It was first described by Scottish surgeon James Cantlie in 1887 when he noticed a difference in the amount of atrophy on both sides of this line of the liver while performing an autopsy. He concluded that the line dividing the atrophied segment from the hypertrophied segment must be the true midline of the liver. This opposed the more commonly accepted opinion that the umbilical fissure divided the liver. The portal vein was already known to divide near the porta hepatis, as described by Francis Glisson in Anatomia hepatis, but Cantlie was the first to propose that the liver could be functionally divided into separate, distinct left and right halves. This was confirmed later in experiments done by Rous and Larimore in 1920 and by Schalm in 1956. Though this discovery was made in 1897, the first clinical portal vein occlusions did not occur until 1982.
