= Lobes of liver =

Four gross divisions of the human liver

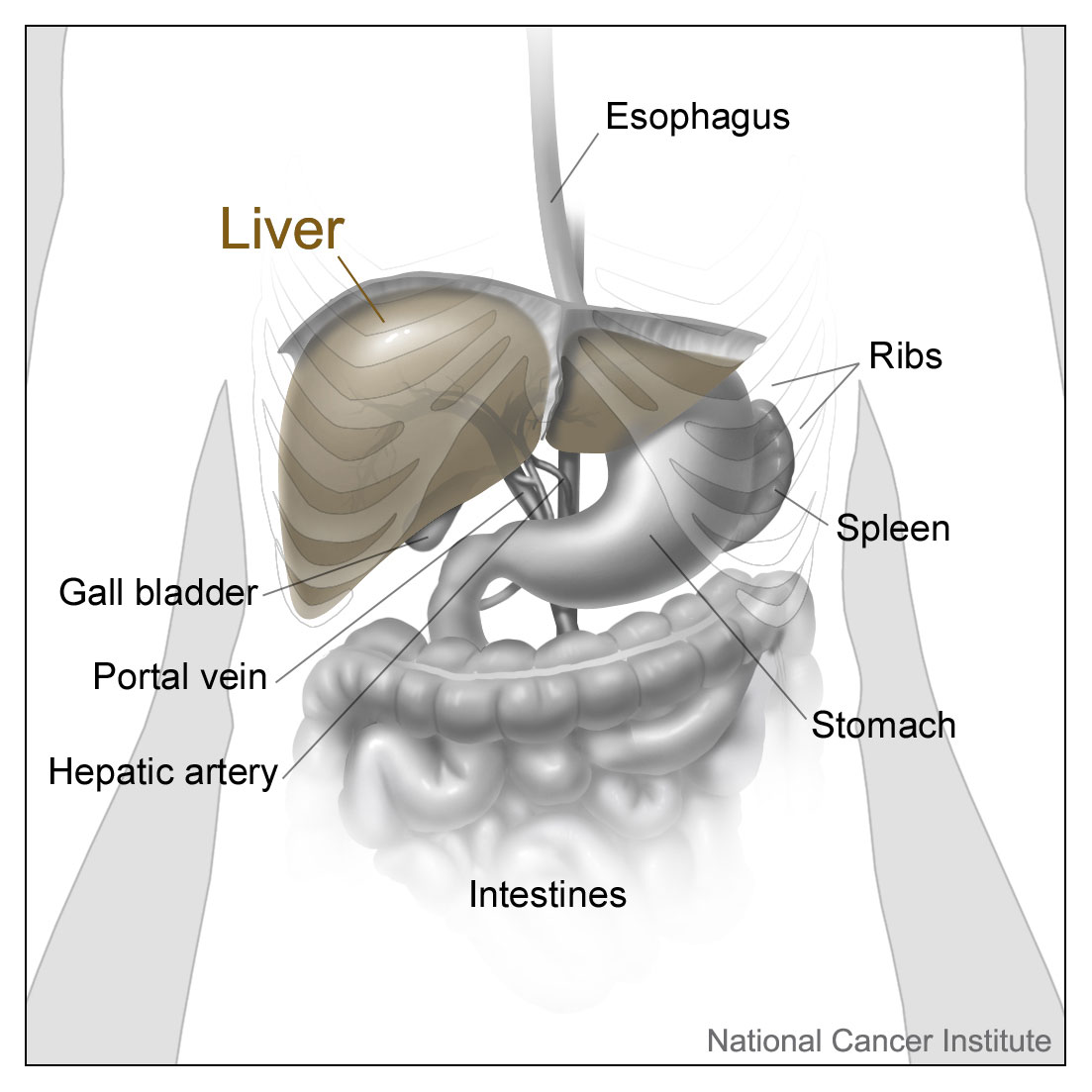
- The liver is divided into four lobes. This image shows the large right lobe and a smaller left lobe separated by the falciform ligament.

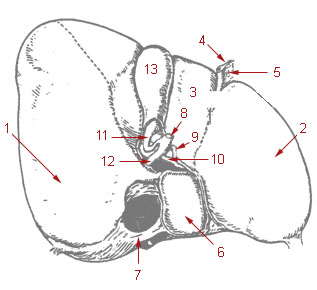
- 1: Right lobe of liver 2: Left lobe of liver 3: Quadrate lobe of liver 4: Round ligament of liver 5: Falciform ligament 6: Caudate lobe of liver 7: Inferior vena cava 8: Common bile duct 9: Hepatic artery 10: Portal vein 11: Cystic duct 12: Common hepatic duct 13: Gallbladder

Details

Identifiers
- Latin: lobus hepatis

In human anatomy, the liver is divided grossly into four parts or lobes: the right lobe, the left lobe, the caudate lobe, and the quadrate lobe. Seen from the front – the diaphragmatic surface – the liver is divided into two lobes: the right lobe and the left lobe. Viewed from the underside – the visceral surface – the other two smaller lobes, the caudate lobe and the quadrate lobe, are also visible. The two smaller lobes, the caudate lobe and the quadrate lobe, are known as superficial or accessory lobes, and both are located on the underside of the right lobe.

The falciform ligament, visible on the front of the liver, makes a superficial division of the right and left lobes of the liver. From the underside, the two additional lobes are located on the right lobe. A line can be imagined running from the left of the vena cava and all the way forward to divide the liver and gallbladder into two halves. This line is called Cantlie's line and is used to mark the division between the two lobes.

Other anatomical landmarks exist, such as the ligamentum venosum and the round ligament of the liver (ligamentum teres), which further divide the left side of the liver in two sections. An important anatomical landmark, the porta hepatis, also known as the transverse fissure of the liver, divides this left portion into four segments, which can be numbered in Roman numerals starting at the caudate lobe as I in an anticlockwise manner. From this parietal view, seven segments can be seen, because the eighth segment is only visible in the visceral view.

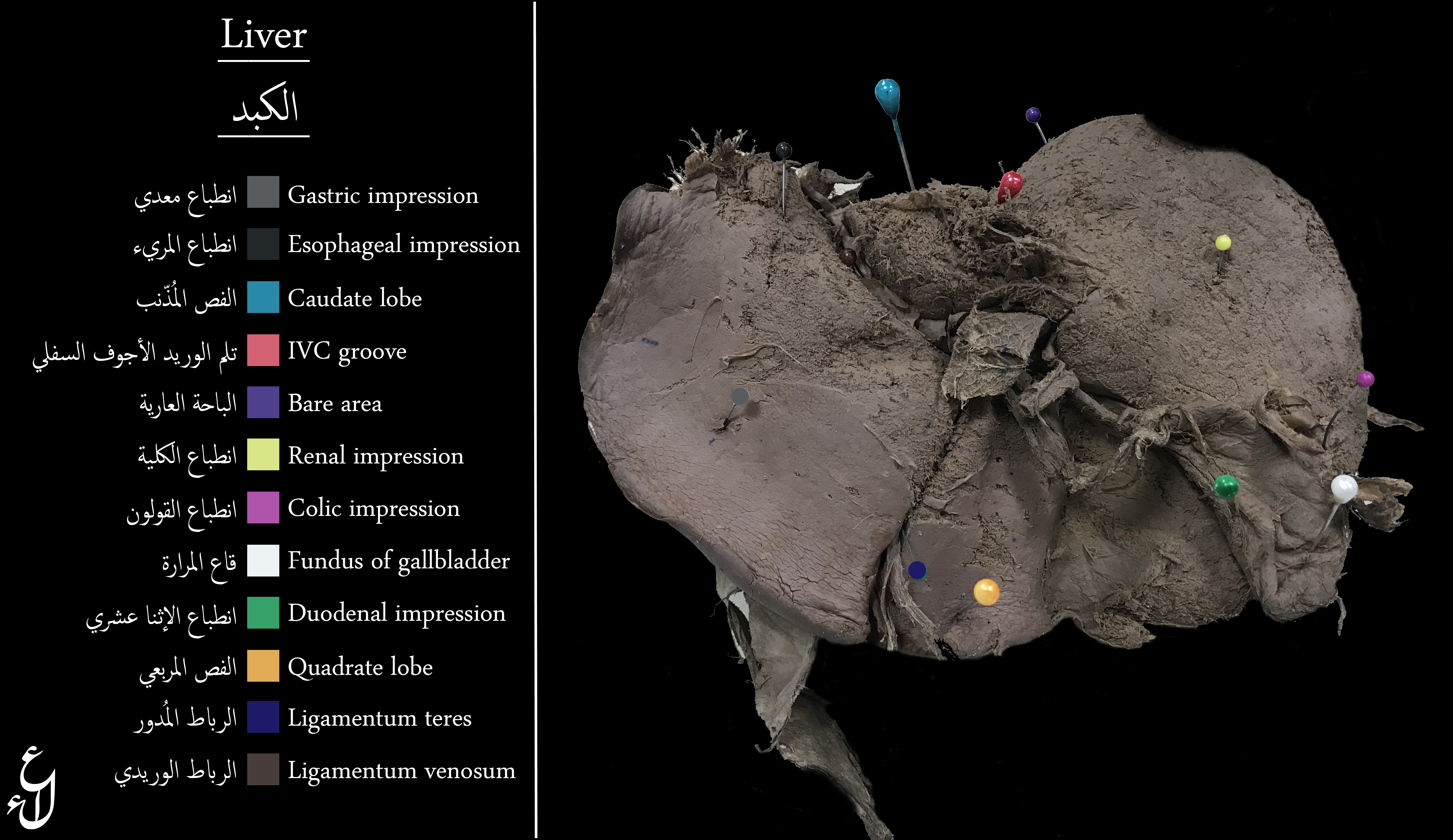
Labeled human liver

== Structure ==
=== Segments ===
Diagram showing the segments of the lobes as classified by Couinaud.

The lobes of the liver are further divided into eight liver segments in the Couinaud system. These are also known as hepatic segments that are surgically resectable.

=== Left lobe ===
The ''left lobe'' is smaller and more flattened than the right. It is situated in the epigastric, and left hypochondriac regions of the abdomen. Its upper surface is slightly convex and is moulded on to the diaphragm; its under surface presents the gastric impression and omental tuberosity.

=== Right lobe ===
The right lobe is six times the size of the left lobe. It occupies the right hypochondrium, on its posterior surface by the ligamentum venosum for the cranial (upper) half and by the ligamentum teres hepatis (round ligament of liver) for the caudal (under) half. The ligamentum teres hepatis turns around the inferior margin of the liver to come out ventral in the falciform ligament.

The right lobe is functionally separated from the left lobe by the middle hepatic vein. From a functional perspective (one that takes the arterial, portal venous, and systemic venous anatomy into account) the falciform ligament separates the medial and lateral segments of the left hepatic lobe.

The right lobe is of a somewhat quadrilateral form. Its under and posterior surfaces being marked by three fossæ: the fossa for the portal vein, the fossa for the gall-bladder and the fossae for the inferior vena cava. These separate the right lobe into two smaller lobes on its left posterior part: the quadrate lobe and the caudate lobe.

=== Quadrate lobe ===
The quadrate lobe is an area of the liver situated on the undersurface of the medial segment left lobe (Couinaud segment IVb), bounded in front by the anterior margin of the liver, behind by the porta hepatis, on the right by the fossa for the gall-bladder, and on the left by the fossa for the umbilical vein.

It is oblong in shape, its antero-posterior diameter being greater than its transverse.

=== Caudate lobe ===
The caudate lobe (posterior hepatic segment I) is situated upon the posterosuperior surface of the liver on the right lobe of the liver, opposite the tenth and eleventh thoracic vertebrae.

The caudate lobe of the liver is bounded below by the porta hepatis, on the right by the fossa for the inferior vena cava, and on the left by the fossa for the ductus venosus and the physiological division of the liver, called the ligamentum venosum. It looks backward, being nearly vertical in position; it is longer from above downward than from side to side, and is somewhat concave in the transverse direction. It is situated behind the porta, and separates the fossa for the gall-bladder from the commencement of the fossa for the inferior vena cava. See Adriaan van den Spiegel 1578-1625 Spiegel's lobe.

Budd–Chiari syndrome, caused by occlusion of hepatic venous outflow, can lead to hypertrophy of the caudate lobe due to its own caval anastomosis that allows for continued function of this lobe of the liver.

The caudate lobe is named after the tail-shaped hepatic tissue (cauda; Latin, "tail") papillary process of the liver, which arise from its left side. It also has a caudate process (that is not tail-like shaped) arising from its right side, which provides surface continuity between the caudate lobe and the visceral surface of the anatomical right lobe of the liver. The caudate process is a small elevation of the hepatic substance extending obliquely and laterally, from the lower extremity of the caudate lobe to the undersurface of the right lobe.

The caudate lobe has a complex blood supply system. It derives its arterial supply from the caudate arteries, which arise from the right, left, and middle hepatic arteries that are connected to each other. Besides, the caudate lobe also derives its supply from the right and left branches of the portal vein. Its venous drainage is through short hepatic veins that drain directly into the inferior vena cava (IVC) due to its proximity to the IVC.
