= Hepatic diverticulum =

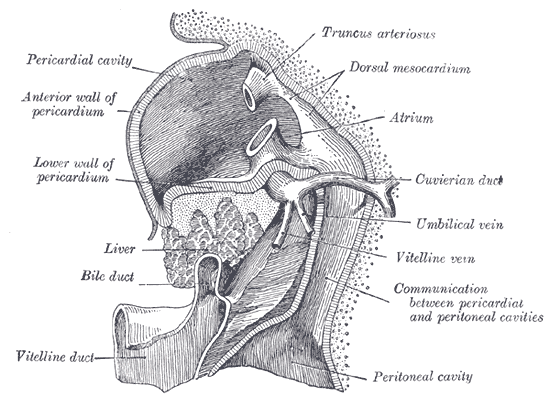
- Liver with the septum transversum. Human embryo 3 mm. long.

Details
- Gives rise to: Liver

Identifiers
- Latin: diverticulum hepaticum
- TE: diverticulum_by_E5.4.6.0.0.0.14 E5.4.6.0.0.0.14

The hepatic diverticulum (or liver bud) is a primordial cellular extension of the embryonic foregut endoderm that gives rise to the parenchyma of the liver and the bile duct. It typically differentiates from the endoderm in the third or fourth week of gestation and is reabsorbed in tubular structures of the septum transversum by the eighth week.
