= Central veins of liver =

Veins through the centers of hepatic (liver) lobules

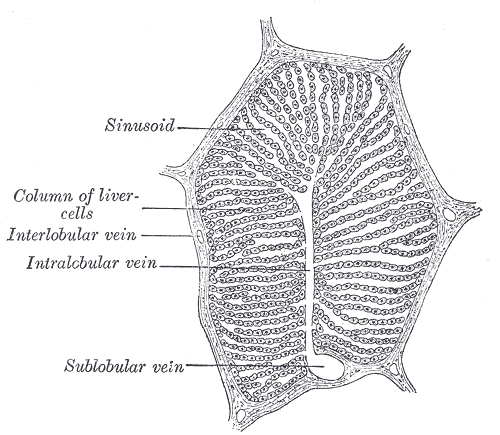
- A single lobule of the liver of a pig. X 60. (Central vein not labeled, though region is visible. Central vein would be a single vein at the center of the lobule.)

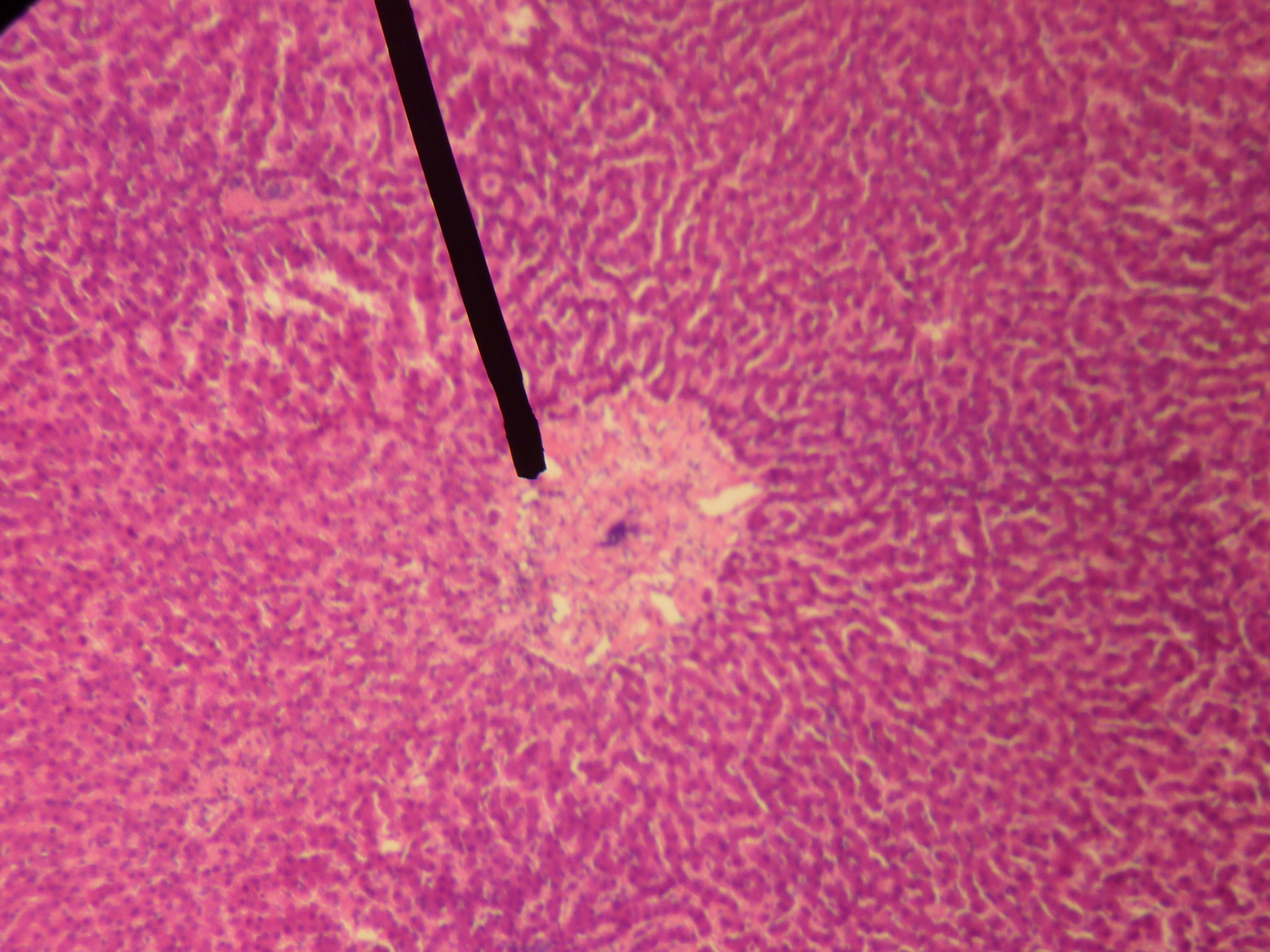
- human central vein

Details
- Drains from: Liver sinusoid
- Drains to: Hepatic veins

Identifiers
- Latin: venae centrales hepatis
- TA98: A05.8.01.059
- TA2: 3065
- FMA: 71629

In microanatomy, the central vein of liver (or central venule) is a vein at the center of each hepatic lobule. It receives the blood mixed in the liver sinusoids to drain it into hepatic veins.
