= Hepatectomy =

Surgical removal (all or part) of the liver

- ICD-9-CM: 50.22-50.4
- MeSH: D006498

Hepatectomy is the surgical resection (removal of all or part) of the liver. While the term is often employed for the removal of the liver from a liver transplant donor, this article will focus on partial resections of hepatic tissue and hepatoportoenterostomy.

== History ==
The first hepatectomies were reported by Dr. Ichio Honjo (1913–1987) of (Kyoto University) in 1949, and Dr. Jean-Louis Lortat-Jacob (1908–1992) of France in 1952. In the latter case, the patient was a 58-year-old woman diagnosed with colorectal cancer which had metastasized to the liver.

== Indications ==
Most hepatectomies are performed for the treatment of hepatic neoplasms, both benign or malign. Benign neoplasms include hepatocellular adenoma, hepatic hemangioma and focal nodular hyperplasia. The most common malignant neoplasms (cancers) of the liver are metastases; those arising from colorectal cancer are among the most common, and the most amenable to surgical resection. The most common primary malignant tumour of the liver is the hepatocellular carcinoma, followed by cholangiocarcinoma. Hepatectomy may also be the procedure of choice to treat intrahepatic gallstones or parasitic cysts of the liver. Partial hepatectomies are also performed to remove a portion of a liver from a living donor for transplantation.

== Technique ==
A hepatectomy is considered a major surgical procedure performed under general anesthesia. Access is accomplished by laparotomy, historically by a bilateral subcostal ("chevron") incision, possibly with midline extension (Calne or "Mercedes-Benz" incision). Nowadays a broadly used approach for open liver resections is the J incision, consisting in a right subcostal incision with midline extension. The anterior approach, one of the most innovative, is made simpler by the liver hanging maneuver.

In most recent years the minimal invasive approach, consisting in laparoscopic and then robotic surgery, has become increasingly common in liver resective surgery.

Hepatectomies may be anatomic, i.e. the lines of resection match the limits of one or more functional segments of the liver as defined by the Couinaud classification (cf. liver#Functional anatomy); or they may be non-anatomic, irregular or "wedge" hepatectomies. Anatomic resections are generally preferred because of the smaller risk of bleeding and biliary fistula; however, non-anatomic resections can be performed safely as well in selected cases. Non-anatomic resection is associated with increased salvageability and re-resection in cases of recurrence.

The Pringle manoeuvre is usually performed during a hepatectomy to minimize blood loss; however, this can lead to reperfusion injury in the liver due to ischemia.

== Complications ==
Bleeding is a feared technical complication and may be grounds for urgent reoperation. It has been demonstrated that the intraoperative blood loss during liver resections affects the outcome in terms of postoperative morbidity and mortality. Biliary fistula is also a possible complication, albeit one more amenable to nonsurgical management. Pulmonary complications such as atelectasis and pleural effusion are commonplace, and dangerous in patients with underlying lung disease. Infection is relatively rare.

Liver failure is the most serious complication of liver resection; this is a major deterrent in the surgical resection of hepatocellular carcinoma in patients with cirrhosis. It is also a problem, to a lesser degree, in patients with previous hepatectomies (e.g. repeat resections for reincident colorectal cancer metastases).

== Results ==
Liver surgery is safe when performed by experienced surgeons with appropriate technological and institutional support. As with most major surgical procedures, there is a marked tendency towards optimal results at the hands of surgeons with high caseloads in selected centres (typically cancer centres and transplantation centres).

For optimal results, combination treatment with systemic or regionally infused chemo or biological therapy should be considered. Prior to surgery, cytotoxic agents such as oxaliplatin given systemically for colorectal metastasis, or chemoembolization for hepatocellular carcinoma can significantly decrease the size of the tumor bulk, allowing then for resections which would remove a segment or wedge portion of the liver only. These procedures can also be aided by application of liver clamp (Lin or Chu liver clamp; Pilling no.604113-61995) in order to minimize blood loss.

== Etymology ==
The word "hepatectomy" is derived from Greek. In Greek liver is hepar and -ectomy comes from the Greek ektomē, "to remove."

== See also ==
- List of surgeries by type
