= Porta hepatis =

Short deep depression on the liver

Transverse fissure of liver
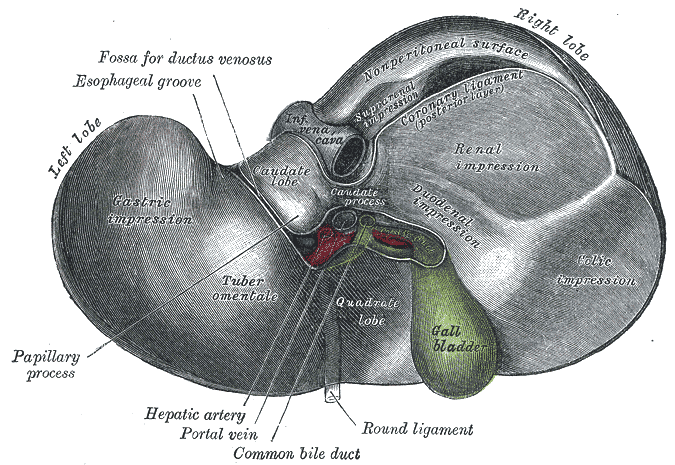
- Inferior surface of the liver.

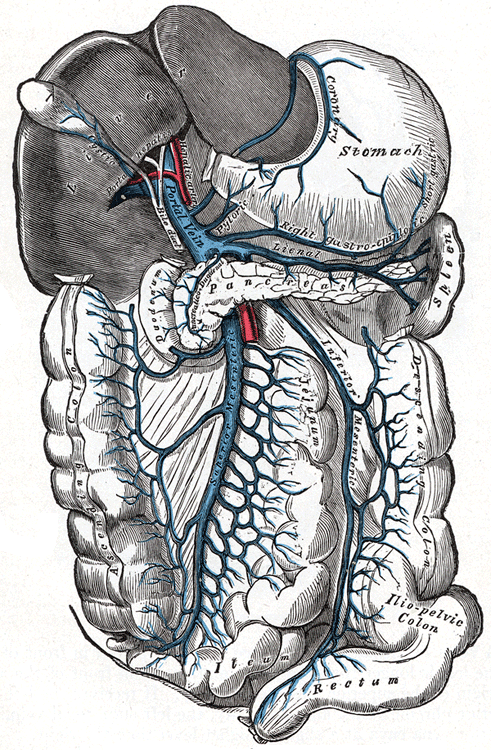
- The portal vein and its tributaries. (Porta hepatis labeled at upper left.)

Details

Identifiers
- Latin: porta hepatis
- TA98: A05.8.01.016
- TA2: 3033
- FMA: 15758

The porta hepatis or transverse fissure of the liver is a short but deep fissure, about 5 cm long, extending transversely beneath the left portion of the right lobe of the liver, nearer its posterior surface than its anterior border.

It joins nearly at right angles with the left sagittal fossa, and separates the quadrate lobe in front from the caudate lobe and process behind.

== Function ==
It transmits the following (in anterior to posterior order):

- common hepatic duct (leaving)
- proper hepatic artery (entering)
- hepatic portal vein (entering)

The hepatic duct lies in front and to the right, the hepatic artery to the left, and the portal vein behind and between the duct and artery.

It also transmits nerves and lymphatics.

- Sympathetic nerves - these provide afferent pain impulses from the liver and gall bladder to the brain. Pain may be referred to the lower pole of the right scapula (T7).
- Hepatic branch of the vagus nerve (CN X).

== Location ==
The porta hepatis runs in the hepatoduodenal ligament.

When the patient is supine, and the liver observed inferiorly (as in a surgeon's perspective), the important structures demarcating its inferior aspect can be represented by a hepatic "H" figure. The right vertical limb of the "H" defines the left and right functional lobes, while the left vertical limb of the "H" defines the right and left anatomical lobes. The horizontal line between the vertical limbs of the "H" represents the porta hepatis. The quadrate and caudate lobe lie superior and inferior to this line respectively.

== See also ==
- Portal triad
