= Claude Couinaud =

French surgeon and anatomist

Claude Couinaud (12 February 1922, in Neuilly-sur-Seine – 4 May 2008, in Paris) was a French surgeon and anatomist who made significant contributions in the field of hepatobiliary surgery. He is best known for his detailed anatomic studies of the liver and was the first to describe its segmental anatomy. These anatomic facts permitted the development of hepatectomies.

His book Le Foie: Études anatomiques et chirurgicales stands as the seminal work on hepatobiliary surgery and anatomy of the 20th century.

== Bibliography ==
- Claude Couinaud, ed. (1989). Surgical Anatomy of the Liver Revisited (in French).
- Claude Couinaud, ed. (1991). Partition Règlée du foie pour Transplantation: Contraintes Anatomiques (Controlled partition of the Liver for Transplantation: Anatomical Limitations) (in French).
