= Dorsal pancreatic agenesis =

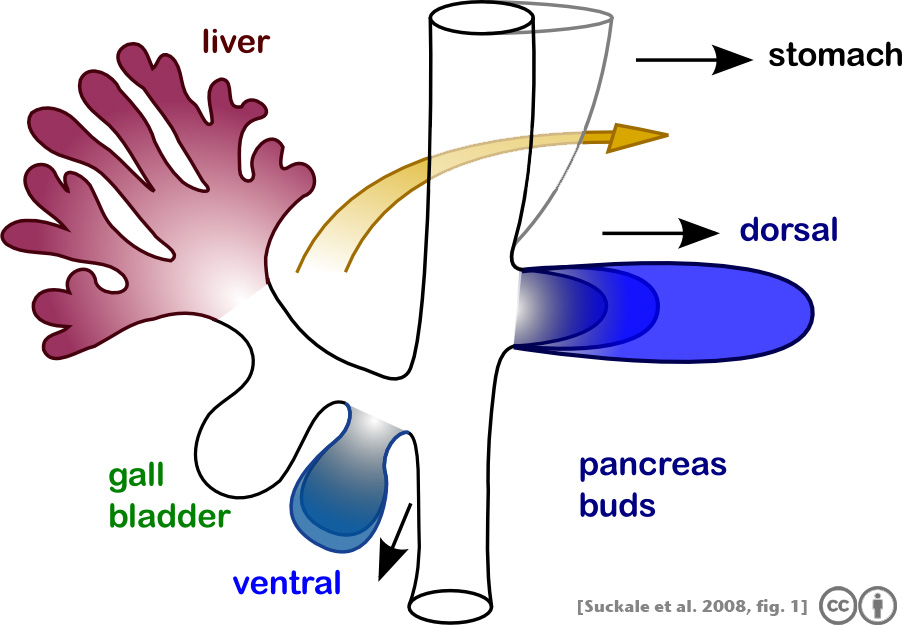
- Embryonic development of pancreas. Showing the dorsal rotation and fusion of ventral bud with dorsal bud during the sixth and seventh week of gestation.

Dorsal pancreatic agenesis is a congenital anomaly characterised by the absence of the duct of Santorini, tail and body of the pancreas. It is regarded as asymptomatic and the most common clinical manifestation is non-specific abdominal pain. While the cause is unclear, its mechanism is thought to be impaired dorsal buds or mutation of genes that regulate organogenesis during embryogenesis.

Early diagnostic methods are laparotomy and autopsy. Endoscopic retrograde cholangiopancreatography (ERCP) and computed tomography scan (CT scan) are combined for diagnosis of this agenesis in recent years. No specific medications are needed for relieving symptoms, but pancreatic enzymes capsule and insulin are prescribed.

Scholars have studied several transcription factors and proteins that can manipulate pancreatic growth and related to dorsal pancreatic agenesis. This malformation is associated with other pancreatic disorders including pancreatitis and pancreatic tumors. Also, patients with this dysgenesis are usually accompanied with pancreatic exocrine dysfunction such as diabetes mellitus.

The prevalence and geographical pattern are unknown. First reported in 1911 by Heiberg in an autopsy.

== Signs and symptoms ==
The agenesis of the dorsal pancreas is asymptomatic in most cases due to the functional reserves of exocrine and endocrine pancreas. Thereby it is often diagnosed incidentally by autopsy, surgery, endoscopy, or imaging technologies during evaluation of other diseases. Some common indicators reported by patients include abdominal pain, weight loss, and jaundice. Abdominal pain could be associated with acute or chronic pancreatitis, pancreatic tumor, diabetic autonomic neuropathy; and weight loss can also be due to diabetes mellitus in some patients.

The localisation of abdominal pain is at epigastrium and aggregates after meals. The two possible reasons for abdominal pain include the underdevelopment of the papillary muscle of the sphincter of Oddi or the autonomic neuropathy due to diabetes mellitus. Dorsal pancreatic agenesis is associated with diabetes mellitus because the β cells in the islets of Langerhans are present in the pancreatic body and tail, which are both absent in agenesis of the dorsal pancreas. Patients with dorsal pancreatic agenesis may result in a defect in the metabolism of hepatic glycogen, which may be related to the reduced β cell mass.

=== Associated conditions ===
==== Pancreatitis ====
Pancreatitis is a common disorder associated with dorsal pancreatic agenesis. However, it is unclear whether the high occurrence of pancreatitis is due to repetitive imaging procedures or whether it is a comorbidity of agenesis.

==== Diabetes mellitus ====
Diabetes mellitus is an endocrine disease that is due to insufficient amount of insulin produced by the pancreas, and it is another common disease linked with dorsal pancreatic agenesis. Insulin is produced by the β cells of the islet of Langerhans in the dorsal pancreas. In patients with agenesis of the dorsal pancreas, the amount of β cells are reduced thus leading to a high possibility of causing diabetes mellitus.

==== Pancreatic tumors ====
Tumors can also be associated with dorsal pancreatic agenesis. Reported pancreatic tumors include solid papillary, solid pseudopapillary tumors, adenocarcinomas, and intraductal papillary mucinous neoplasms (IPMN).

==== Organ malfunction ====
Organ malfunction is also associated with dorsal pancreatic agenesis. Disorders such as polycystic kidney disease, Kartagener syndrome, multiple splenic deformities, congenital choledochal cysts, and biliary atresia have been reported.

== Cause ==
There is no suggested cause for the dorsal pancreatic agenesis, however there are several hypotheses for the underlying mechanism. As the dorsal pancreatic bud is the ancestor for the majority of pancreas, one possible explanation to this rare anomaly is the dorsal mesentery ischemia which induces the dysgenesis of pancreas. In spite of the unknown molecular mechanism, some scholars have speculated the mode of inheritance of this agenesis, which is autosomal-dominant or X-linked disease.

=== Genetics ===
Scientists have demonstrated a wide spectrum of genes that can manipulate and regulate the embryonic pancreatic development by in vivo animal study. The formation of dorsal and ventral buds is reliant on the interaction of transcription factors, for instance the Pax4, Pax6 and Ptf1a. By expressing sonic hedgehog (Shh) or Indian hedgehog (Ihh), the growth of both dorsal and ventral buds from the foregut endoderm is repressed to a large extent, inhibition of Shh or Ihh signaling pathway favor the pancreatic development. The Homeodomain protein HB9 (Hlxb9) is critical for the formation of the dorsal bud, however it is not significant to the ventral bud. Another homeodomain protein, PDX1 (also known as Ipf-1 insulin promoter factor 1) is the initiator of buds expression, genetic mutation on gene Ipf-1 can lead to pancreatic agenesis. Also, both heterozygous and homozygous variant of PDX1 can cause dysgenesis of pancreas and neonatal diabetes.

CDH2 (CD352) gene encoded Neural-cadherin (N-cadherin) is identified to have an active role in recruiting dorsal pancreatic mesenchyme for pancreatic morphogenesis, depletion of N-cadherin in mice can lead to the apoptosis of dorsal pancreatic mesenchyme cells. Moreover, research suggests that retinoid acid is significant for the development of pancreas as the deficiency of retinoid acid can induce dorsal pancreatic agenesis in mice.

== Embryonic development of pancreas ==
The pancreas is responsible for secreting various enzymes for most digestion. It is a retroperitoneal organ posterior to the great curvature of the stomach. Its anterior surface is covered by the parietal peritoneum while the posterior surface contacts the aorta as well as other viscera on the left posterior body wall. Its 15 cm entity is divided into three parts, a globular head attached to the right side of duodenum, a long body, and a blunt head. In embryonic development, the pancreas is formed by the convergence of the two pancreatic buds (dorsal and ventral) during the sixth and seventh week of gestation, but the development of these two buds is initiated at about week 4. During the gestation phase which takes place at week 4, the dorsal bud develops from the dorsal mesentery, and forms the body and tail of the pancreas. Meanwhile, the ventral bud arises inferior to form the head of the pancreas. Two weeks later, the ventral bud will rotate dorsally and fuse with the dorsal bud to form the pancreas. The fusion of the duct happened at the same time, to form the duct of Wirsung and the duct of Santorini. Any deviation from the normal pancreatic embryogenesis process can potentially lead to congenital malformation of the pancreas. Among all anomalies, Pancreatic Divisum is the most prevalent one, followed by Pancreatic Heterotopia. In comparison, a complete agenesis of dorsal pancreas is rare and often associated with infant mortality.

The agenesis of dorsal pancreas can be classified into two classes based on the morphological features: complete and partial agenesis. For the former one, the accessory pancreatic duct (also known as duct of Santorini) as well as the body and tail of the pancreas are missing. For partial agenesis, the tail of the pancreas is still present.

== Diagnosis ==
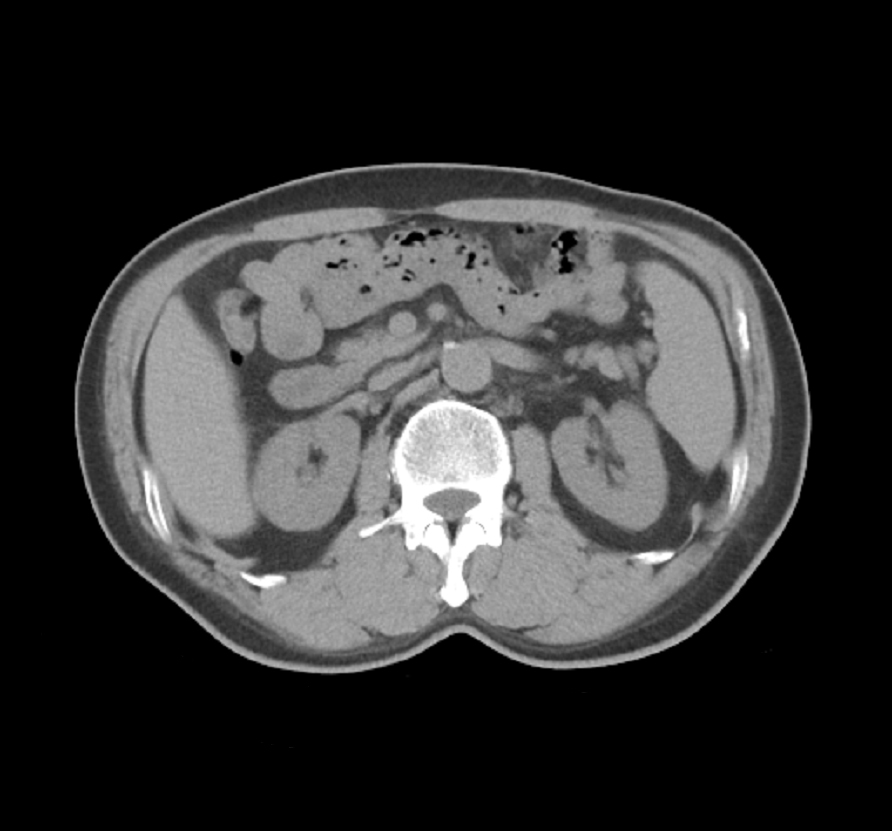
CT scan of the abdomen, showing the presence of pancreas.

Dorsal pancreatic agenesis with advancement in modern day technology, is currently diagnosed with the following imaging technologies, and sometimes a combination of these methods.

Illustration of the endoscopic retrogradecholangiopancreatography (ERCP). Showing a visible pancreas in yellow.

- Endoscopic retrograde cholangiopancreatography (ERCP). An invasive, operator-dependent gold standard for diagnosis. It presents the pancreatic duct; the absence or presence of the dorsal ductal system and the minor papilla can be used to indicate dorsal pancreatic agenesis.
- Magnetic resonance cholangiopancreatography (MRCP). A non-invasive, accurate type of MRI to depict the major and accessory pancreatic ducts.
- Magnetic resonance imaging (MRI). A non-invasive, non-radiation exposed method that can be used to identify the morphological structure of the pancreas.
- Computed Tomography (CT). A non-invasive method to diagnose dorsal pancreatic agenesis by an absence of pancreatic tissue ventral to the splenic vein.
- Stomach/intestine sign. Can be used to distinguish dorsal pancreatic agenesis from distal pancreatic lipomatosis.
- Transabdominal Ultrasound (US). The diagnostic ability depends on pancreatic bowel gas or the patient's body habitus.

Agenesis of dorsal pancreas has to be differentiated with pancreatic fat infiltration, chronic pancreatitis and atrophy of pancreatic body and tail. The absence of pancreatic body and tail is the usual manifestation of dorsal pancreatic agenesis, the density and morphological features of the pancreatic head should be either normal or slightly enlarged due to compensation of the absent body and tail.

Stomach/intestine sign can combine with CT for better diagnosis. Since dorsal pancreatic agenesis can be at times complicated with pancreatic tumors, CT is a visualisation tool that can be used to exclude both pancreatic tumors and abdominal tumors, which allows for improved observation.

== Management ==
Vast majority of dorsal pancreatic agenesis cases are diagnosed incidentally and asymptomatic, hence there is no special medication for dorsal pancreatic agenesis.

=== Medication ===
1. Pancreatic enteric-coated capsules. A proposed study suggested dorsal pancreatic agenesis patients show Exocrine Pancreatic Insufficiency (EPI) related symptoms. Oral administration of pancreatic enzymes, including lipase, protease and amylase is useful for relieving EPI related symptoms. In addition, pay attention to drugs that may interact with pancreatic enzymes such as Acarbose and Miglitol.

2. Exogenous insulin. Patients with dorsal pancreatic agenesis have lost the tail of pancreas which contain the Islet of Langerhan for insulin production. Therefore, exogenous insulin can be used to treat the accompanied Diabetes Mellitus.

== History ==
Dorsal pancreatic agenesis is an extremely rare disease, there are only about 100 cases reported so far and no association discovered between a specific geographical location and disease prevalence. First reported in 1911 by Heiberg in an autopsy. The patient was diagnosed with diabetes mellitus and associated with pulmonary tuberculosis, the observed morphology of pancreatic head was described as "large and thick". Two years later, the second case was reported by Ghon and Roman (1913).
