= Duodenal papilla =

Duodenal papilla may refer to:

- Major duodenal papilla
- Minor duodenal papilla
