= A4GNT =

Identifiers
- Aliases: A4GNT, alpha4GnT, alpha-1,4-N-acetylglucosaminyltransferase
- External IDs: OMIM: 616709; MGI: 2143261; GeneCards: A4GNT

Gene location (Human)
Chr.	Chromosome 3 (human)
Band	3q22.3	Start	138,123,713 bp
Band	3q22.3	End	138,132,390 bp

Gene location (Mouse)
Chr.	Chromosome 9 (mouse)
Band	9|9 E3.3	Start	99,494,555 bp
Band	9|9 E3.3	End	99,504,420 bp
RNA expression pattern
Bgee	Human / Mouse (ortholog); Top expressed in: pylorus; pancreatic ductal cell; body of pancreas; body of stomach; gallbladder; fundus; duodenum; stromal cell of endometrium; gonad; human kidney / Top expressed in: epithelium of stomach; proximal tubule; right kidney; Paneth cell; duodenum; human kidney; secondary oocyte; lumbar subsegment of spinal cord; skin of abdomen; lip; More reference expression data
BioGPS	n/a
Gene ontology
Molecular function	glycosyltransferase activity; transferase activity; acetylglucosaminyltransferase activity
Cellular component	integral component of membrane; Golgi membrane; Golgi apparatus; membrane
Biological process	glycoprotein biosynthetic process; O-glycan processing; negative regulation of epithelial cell proliferation; protein glycosylation; protein O-linked glycosylation; carbohydrate metabolic process
Sources:Amigo / QuickGO
Orthologs
Databases	NCBI: entry; OMA: entry
Species	Human	Mouse
Entrez	51146	333424
Ensembl	ENSG00000118017	ENSMUSG00000037953
UniProt	Q9UNA3	Q14BT6
RefSeq (mRNA)	NM_016161	NM_001077424
RefSeq (protein)	NP_057245	NP_001070892
Location (UCSC)	Chr 3: 138.12 – 138.13 Mb	Chr 9: 99.49 – 99.5 Mb
PubMed search
- Wikidata
View/Edit Human	View/Edit Mouse

Alpha-1,4-N-acetylglucosaminyltransferase is an enzyme that in humans is encoded by the A4GNT gene. This enzyme is part of the production of type III mucin, which is found in the stomach, duodenum, and pancreatic ducts.

== Enzyme activity ==
This enzyme functions as an acetylglucosaminyltransferase, which means it moves an acetylglucosamine (GlcNAc) from one molecule to another. In this case it moves the GlcNAc from a UDP-N-acetyl-alpha-D-glucosamine donor to a galactose residue on an O-glycans. It catalyzes the following reaction:

a beta-D-galactoside + UDP-N-acetyl-alpha-D-glucosamine → an N-acetyl-alpha-D-glucosaminyl-(1->4)-beta-D-galactosyl derivative + UDP + H^{+}

It can also apply to beta-(1->3)-linked residues.
