= Sphincter of Boyden =

Sphincter in the human digestive system

Details
- Part of: common bile duct
- System: digestive system
- Function: controls flow of bile

The sphincter of Boyden (also known as the choledochal sphincter) is a sphincter located in the common bile duct before it joins with the pancreatic duct to form the ampulla of vater. This sphincter controls the flow of bile into the pancreatic duct and it helps in filling up of the gallbladder with bile.

== Structure ==
The sphincter of Boyden is a smooth muscle sphincter surrounding the common bile duct (ductus choledocus). It occurs just before the junction with the pancreatic duct, where the ampulla of Vater is formed. Occasionally, some fibres also surround the pancreatic duct.

It is subdivided into two parts - pars superior and pars inferior. The pars inferior is the strongest component of the sphincter of Oddi complex.

== Function ==
The sphincter of Boyden controls the flow of bile from the common bile duct into the pancreatic duct. This helps with filling of the gallbladder with bile.

Its contractions regulate the passage of bile into the gall bladder or the duodenum.

== History ==
This is named after the American anatomist Edward Allen Boyden (1886-1976), who served as the 32nd president of the American Association of Anatomists from 1956 to 1957.
