= Pancreatic bud =

Anatomical feature of human embryo

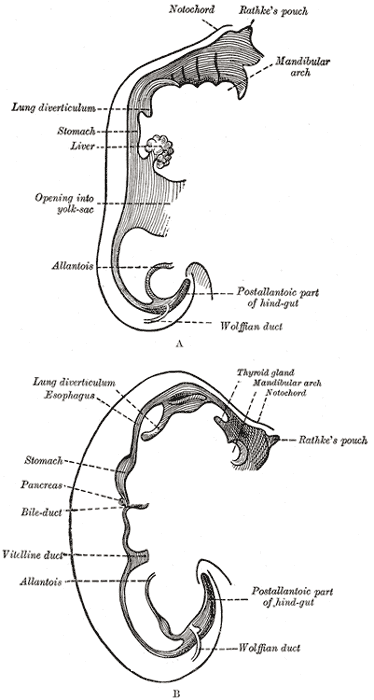
- Sketches in profile of two stages in the development of the human digestive tube. (His.) A X 30. B X 20.

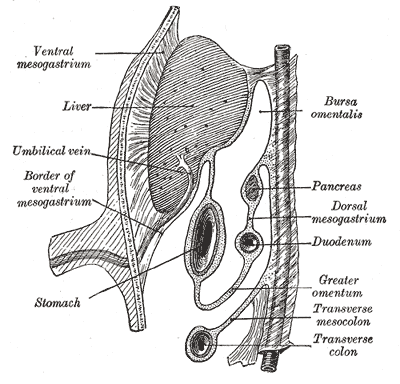
- Schematic figure of the bursa omentalis, etc. Human embryo of eight weeks.

Details
- Precursor: Foregut (superior portion)
- Gives rise to: Pancreas, pancreatic duct

The ventral and dorsal pancreatic buds (or pancreatic diverticula) are outgrowths of the duodenum during human embryogenesis. They join to form the adult pancreas.

The proximal portion of the dorsal pancreatic bud gives rise to the accessory pancreatic duct, while the distal portion of the dorsal pancreatic bud and ventral pancreatic bud give rise to the major pancreatic duct.

The ventral pancreatic bud develops into the pancreatic head and uncinate process.

== Associated Disorders ==
In pancreas divisum the ducts of the pancreas are not fused to form a full pancreas, but instead it remains as a distinct dorsal and ventral duct. Without the proper fusion of both ducts the majority of the pancreas drainage is mainly through the accessory papilla. Three different variations in pancreas divisum have been described: the first is the classic example of pancreas divisum in which the ventral duct is visualized but there is total failure of fusion; the second variation is with the absence of a ventral duct; and the third variation is when there is very basic communication between the two ducts. Pancreatitis is a major complication of pancreas divisum.

== Additional images ==
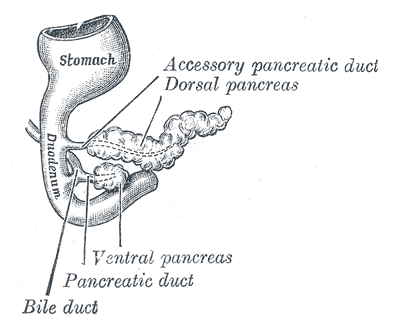
Pancreas of a human embryo of five weeks.

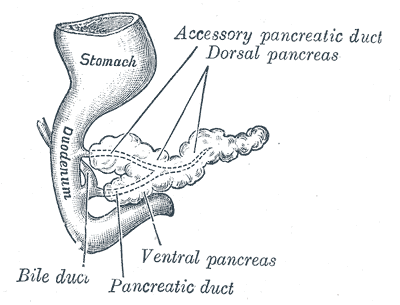
Pancreas of a human embryo at end of the sixth week.
