= Giovanni Domenico Santorini =

Italian anatomist (1681–1737)

- Giovanni Domenico Santorini
- Born: 6 June 1681; Venice, Republic of Venice
- Died: 7 May 1737 (aged 55); Venice, Republic of Venice
- Education: University of Pisa
- Occupation: Anatomist

Giovanni Domenico Santorini (June 6, 1681 – May 7, 1737) was an Italian phisician and anatomist. A professor of anatomy and obstetrics in Venice, he is remembered for his highly accurate and rigorous dissections of the human body.

== Biography ==
Giovanni Domenico Santorini was born in Venice on 6 June 1681. The son of an apothecary, he earned his medical degree from the University of Pisa in 1701. Widely acknowledged as one of the most outstanding anatomists of his time, he performed anatomical demonstrations in Venice from 1705 until 1728.

== Work ==
Santorini is best known for his 1724 treatise Observationes Anatomicae, a detailed work on the anatomy of the human body. He is credited with providing descriptions of several anatomical structures, including the following:

- Santorini's cartilage: The corniculate cartilage of the larynx.
- Santorini's concha: The supreme nasal concha (turbinate).
- Duct of Santorini: An accessory duct of the pancreas.
- Santorini's fissures: Vertical fissures in the anterior part of the cartilage of the external acoustic meatus (ear canal).
- Santorini's minor caruncle: Location of the opening of the accessory pancreatic duct into the duodenum.
- Santorini's muscle: Bundle of muscular fibers that draw the angle of the mouth laterally. Sometimes called the Albinus muscle; named after German anatomist Bernhard Siegfried Albinus (1697–1770).
- Santorini's vein: Vein which passes through the parietal foramen and links the superior sagittal sinus with veins of the scalp.
- Santorini's plexus: plexus of veins found in the Cave of Retzius (retropubic space), see prostatic venous plexus.

== Bibliography ==
- Kleinerman, Rachel; et al. (2013). "Giovanni Domenico Santorini (1681–1737): A prominent physician and meticulous anatomist". Clinical Anatomy. 27 (4): 545–547. doi:10.1002/ca.22294. PMID 24038149.
- Leake, Chauncey D. (1970). "Santorini, Giovanni Domenico". In Charles Coulston Gillispie (ed.). Dictionary of Scientific Biography. Vol. 12. New York: Charles Scribner's Sons. p. 100.
