= Uncinate =

Uncinate, meaning "hooked," can have several meanings in anatomy.

- Uncinate process of pancreas
- Uncinate process of ethmoid bone, close to nasal sinus
