= Ruggero Oddi =

Italian physiologist and anatomist

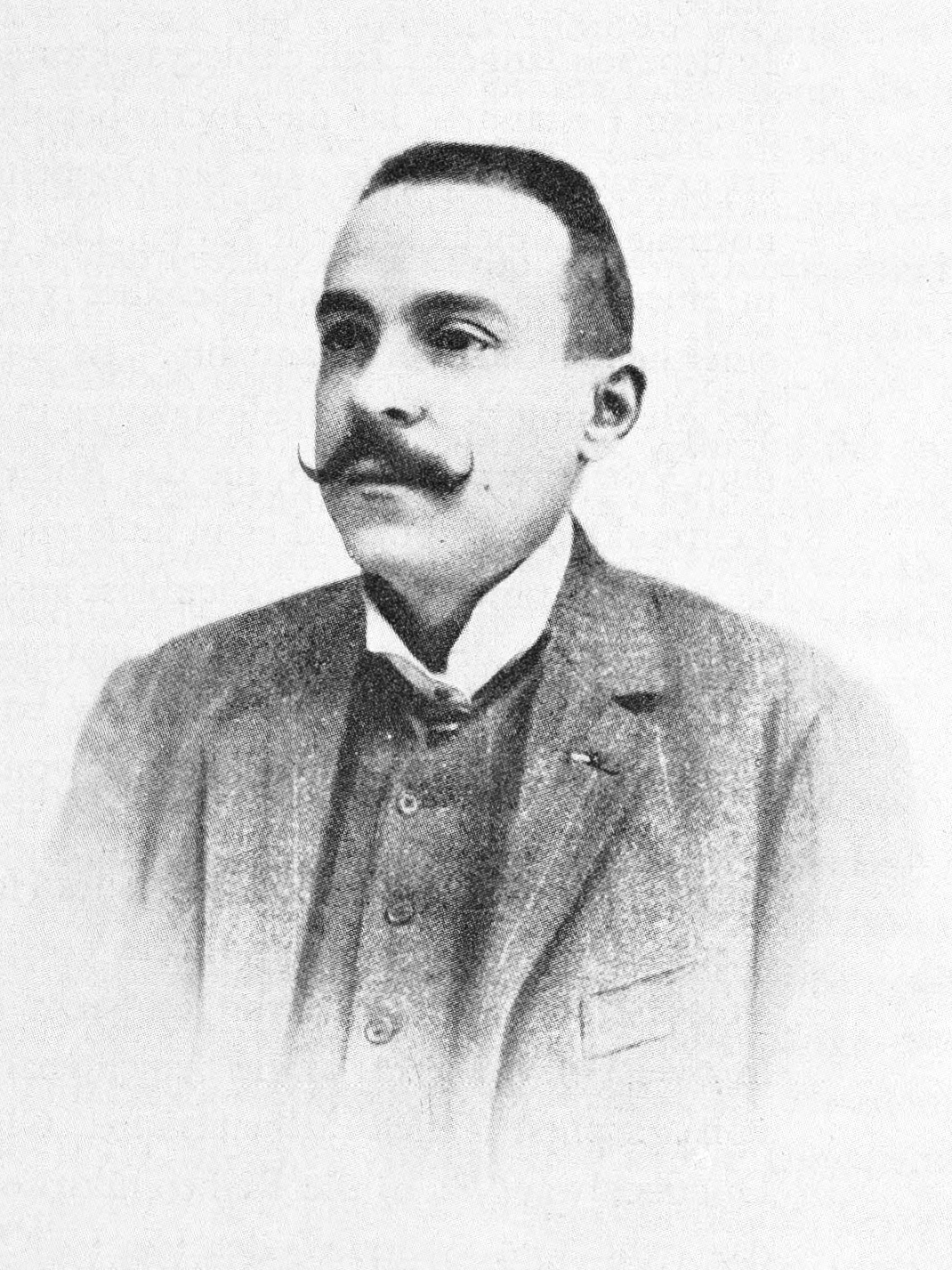
- Portrait of Oddi, 1906
- Born: July 20, 1864; Perugia, Italy
- Died: March 22, 1913 (aged 48); Tunis, Tunisia
- Education: University of Bologna
- Known for: Sphincter of Oddi
- Scientific career
- Fields: physiology anatomy
- Workplaces: University of Genoa

Ruggero Oddi (July 20, 1864 – March 22, 1913) was an Italian physiologist and anatomist who was a native of Perugia. He is most well known for the sphincter of Oddi, which was named after him.

== Biography ==
He studied medicine at Perugia, University of Bologna and Florence, and in 1894 was appointed head of the Physiology Institute at the University of Genoa. In 1900 he was relieved of his position at Genoa because of narcotics usage and fiscal improprieties. Later, he sought employment as a doctor with the Belgian colonial medical service, and spent some time working in the Belgian Congo. Oddi died on March 22, 1913, in Tunis, Tunisia.

While still a student, in 1887, 23-year-old Oddi described a small group of circular and longitudinal muscle fibers that wrapped around the end of the bile and pancreatic ducts in 1887. This structure was later to be known as the eponymous "sphincter of Oddi". Oddi was not the original discoverer of the sphincter; English physician Francis Glisson initially identified it two centuries earlier, however it was Oddi who was first able to characterize its physiological properties.

Inflammation of the junction of the duodenum and common bile duct at the sphincter of Oddi is referred to as "odditis".

== Sources ==
- Belloni, L (1965). "[On the life and work of Ruggero Oddi (1864-1913)]". Rivista di storia della medicina. 9 (2). Italy: 151–9. ISSN 0035-6565. PMID 5326779.
- Capodicasa, Enrico (Aug 2008). "Ruggero Oddi: 120 years after the description of the eponymous sphincter: a story to be remembered". J. Gastroenterol. Hepatol. 23 (8 Pt 1). Australia: 1200–3. doi:10.1111/j.1440-1746.2008.05417.x. PMID 18637058. S2CID 23246353.
- Haubrich, William (1999). "Biographical Sketches: Oddi of the sphincter of Oddi". Gastroenterology. 116 (3): 542. doi:10.1016/S0016-5085(99)70217-9.
- Loukas, Marios; Spentzouris Georgios; Tubbs R Shane; Kapos Theodoros; Curry Brain (Nov 2007). "Ruggero Ferdinando Antonio Giuseppe Vincenzo Oddi". World Journal of Surgery. 31 (11). United States: 2260–5. doi:10.1007/s00268-007-9019-1. ISSN 0364-2313. PMID 17902018. S2CID 31519026.
- Modlin, I M; Ahlman H (May 1994). "Oddi: the paradox of the man and the sphincter". Archives of Surgery. 129 (5). United States: 549–56. doi:10.1001/archsurg.1994.01420290095014. ISSN 0004-0010. PMID 8185478.
- Trancanelli, V (Feb 1993). "[Ruggero Oddi and the discovery of the common bile duct sphincter]". Minerva Med. 84 (1–2). Italy: 57–66. ISSN 0026-4806. PMID 8464569.
- Ono, K; Hada R (Jul 1988). "Ruggero Oddi. To commemorate the centennial of his original article--"Di una speciale disposizione a sfintere allo sbocco del coledoco"". The Japanese Journal of Surgery. 18 (4). Japan: 373–5. doi:10.1007/BF02471459. ISSN 0047-1909. PMID 3050213. S2CID 30812172.
- Morelli, A; Sorcetti F (Apr 1988). "Ruggero Oddi's life". Zeitschrift für Gastroenterologie. Verhandlungsband. 23. West Germany: 203–7. ISSN 0172-8504. PMID 2454553.
- Ono, K (Oct 1985). "[Ruggero Oddi and sphincter of Oddi: the retrospective and prospective views]". Nippon Heikatsukin Gakkai Zasshi. 21 (5). Japan: 369–85. doi:10.1540/jsmr1965.21.369. ISSN 0374-3527. PMID 3916000.
- Sorcetti, F (1985). "[Ruggero Oddi, physician and scientist of Perugia]". Riv. Biol. 78 (1). Italy: 133–40. ISSN 0035-6050. PMID 3892638.
- Yamada, Tadataka (2011). Textbook of Gastroenterology (6 ed.). John Wiley & Sons. ISBN 978-1444359411.
