= Abraham Vater =

German anatomist

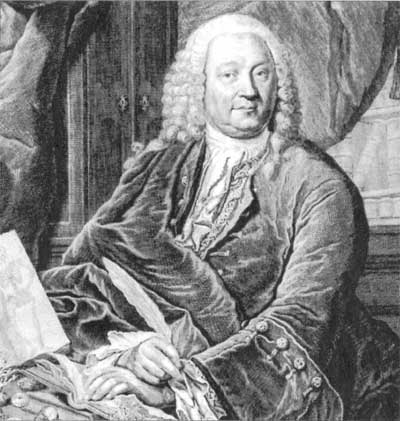
- Born: 9 December 1684; Wittenberg, Electorate of Saxony
- Died: 18 November 1751 (aged 66)
- Education: University of Wittenberg
- Known for: First to describe hepatopancreatic ampulla
- Scientific career
- Fields: Anatomy

Abraham Vater (9 December 1684 – 18 November 1751) was a German anatomist from Wittenberg, Electorate of Saxony.

He received his doctorate in philosophy from the University of Wittenberg in 1706, and his medical degree from the University of Leipzig in 1710. Afterwards, he embarked on a scientific trip through Germany, Holland and England. In Amsterdam he met with Frederik Ruysch (1638-1731). He later gained his habilitation in Wittenberg, becoming an associate professor in 1719, a full professor of anatomy in 1732 and a professor of therapy in 1746.

Vater is primarily known for his work in anatomy, but he also published works in the fields of chemistry, botany, pharmacology and gynaecology. He was the first to describe the hepatopancreatic ampulla, which is the juncture of the pancreatic duct and the common bile duct, and is now referred to as the ampulla of Vater.

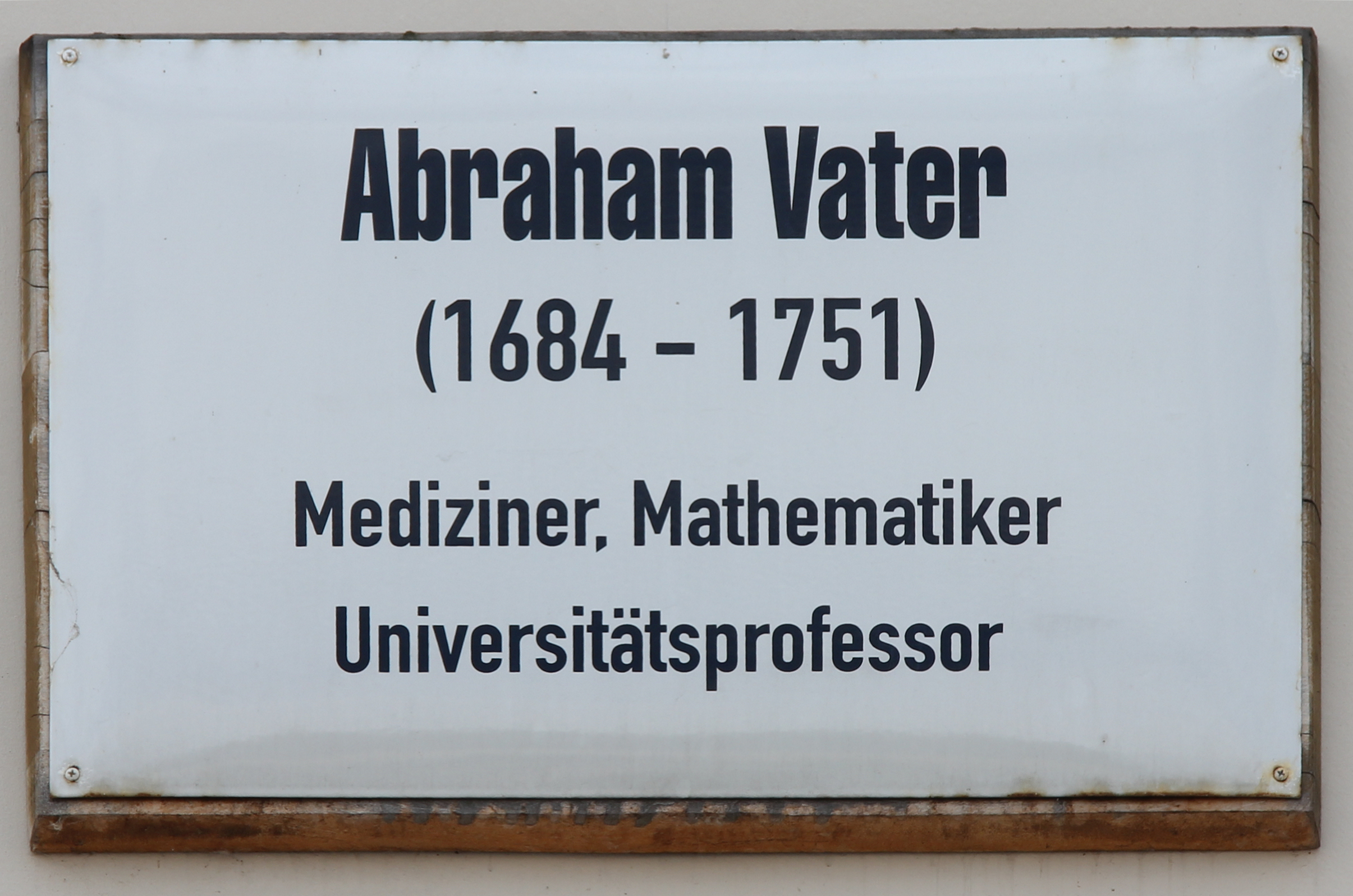
Plaque commemorating Vater at Schloßstraße 14-15, in Wittenberg

In 1719, Vater was the first to notice oval-shaped organs of concentric layers of connective tissue wrapped around nerve endings in the skin. They were between 1–4 mm long, and he called the structures papillae nerveae. Apparently his research was forgotten, because in 1831 they were rediscovered by anatomist Filippo Pacini (1812–1883) when performing a dissection of a hand. Pacini was the first to describe their functionality as mechanoreceptors that are sensitive to vibration and pressure changes, and thus the structures were to become known as Pacinian corpuscles. Today, the term "Vater-Pacini corpuscles" is sometimes used to credit the discoveries of both men. These organs are one of several types of mechanoreceptors in the body, some others being Meissner corpuscles (tactile and touch receptors), Ruffini corpuscles (respond to skin stretch and torque), and Krause corpuscles.

His name is also associated with "Vaters fold", defined as a fold in the mucous membrane in the duodenum located just above the hepatopancreatic ampulla.

== Writings ==
- Dissertatio anatomica quo novum bilis dicetilicum circa orifucum ductus choledochi ut et valvulosam colli vesicæ felleæ constructionem ad disceptandum proponit, 1720
- Das Blatter-Beltzen oder die Art und Weise, die Blattern durch künstliche Einpfropfung zu erwecken, 1721
- Catalogus plantarum inprimis exoticarum horti academici Wittenbergensis, 1721–1724
- Catalogus Variorum Exoticorum Rarissimorum Maximam Partem Incognitorum ... quae in museo suo, brevi luci exponendo possidet Abraham Vater, 1726
- Diss., qua valor et sufficienta signorum infantem recens natum aut motuum aut vivum editum arguentium examinatur, 1735
- De calculis in locis inusitatis natis et per vias insolitas exclusis, 1741
- De instrumentoro ad determinadas lucis refractiones, 1751

== See also ==
- German inventors and discoverers
