= Uncinate process of pancreas =

Part of the pancreas

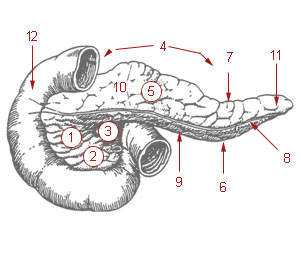
- 1: Head of pancreas 2: Uncinate process of pancreas 3: Pancreatic notch 4: Body of pancreas 5: Anterior surface of pancreas 6: Inferior surface of pancreas 7: Superior margin of pancreas 8: Anterior margin of pancreas 9: Inferior margin of pancreas 10: Omental tuber 11: Tail of pancreas 12: Duodenum

Details
- Artery: superior mesenteric artery

Identifiers
- Latin: processus uncinatus pancreatis
- TA98: A05.9.01.003
- TA2: 3116
- FMA: 15857

The uncinate process is a small part of the pancreas. The uncinate process is the formed prolongation of the angle of junction of the lower and left lateral borders in the head of the pancreas. The word "uncinate" comes from the Latin "uncinatus", meaning "hooked".

== Structure ==
=== Development ===
The pancreas arises as two separate bodies, the dorsal pancreas and the ventral pancreas. The dorsal pancreas appears first, at around day 26, opposite the developing hepatic duct, and grows into the dorsal mesentery. The ventral pancreas develops at the junction of the hepatic duct and the rest of the foregut.

During development, differential growth of the wall of the stomach causes it to rotate to the left, and the liver and stomach undergo a lot of growth. This makes the two parts of the pancreas rotate around the duodenum. They then fuse; the dorsal pancreatic bud becomes the body, tail, and isthmus of the pancreas. The isthmus (also called the central pancreas) is the region of the gland that runs anterior to the superior mesenteric artery; by convention, it divides the right and left sides of the pancreas.

The ventral pancreatic bud forms the pancreatic head and uncinate process. The glands continue to develop but the duct systems anastomose. The main pancreatic duct is formed by the fusion of the dorsal and ventral pancreas.

The embryology also explains the strange zig-zag course of the main pancreatic duct and the occasional appearance of an accessory pancreatic duct.

The uncinate process, unlike the remainder of the organ, passes posteriorly to the superior mesenteric vein (it can pass posteriorly to the superior mesenteric artery, but this is less common).

== Clinical significance ==
Sometimes the pancreas fails to develop normally and there may be congenital defects associated with the uncinate process. The uncinate process may split and encircle the duodenum, which is known as an annular pancreas. There is also a common condition called pancreas divisum where the dorsal and ventral pancreas do not fuse properly.
