= Major duodenal papilla =

Anatomic feature in the intestines

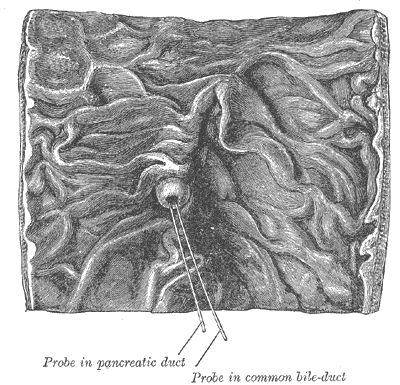
- Interior of the descending portion of the duodenum, showing bile papilla

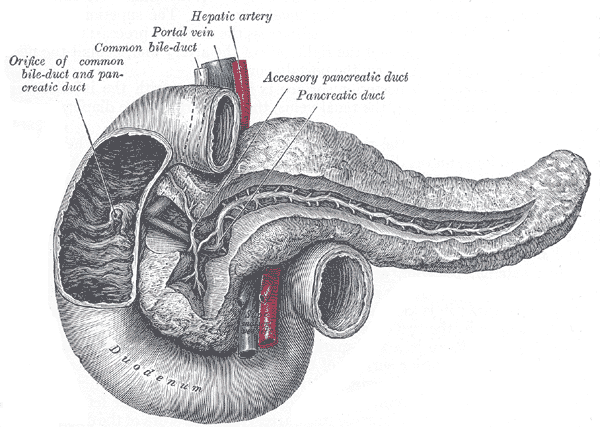
- The pancreatic duct

Details

Identifiers
- Latin: papilla duodeni major
- TA98: A05.6.02.015
- TA2: 2955
- FMA: 15074

The major duodenal papilla (papilla of Vater) is a rounded projection in the duodenum into which the common bile duct and pancreatic duct drain. The major duodenal papilla is, in most people, the primary mechanism for the secretion of bile and other enzymes that facilitate digestion.

== Structure ==
1. Bile ducts: 2. Intrahepatic bile ducts; 3. Left and right hepatic ducts; 4. Common hepatic duct; 5. Cystic duct; 6. Common bile duct; 7. Ampulla of Vater; 8. Major duodenal papilla; 9. Gallbladder; 10–11. Right and left lobes of liver: 12. Spleen; 13. Esophagus; 14. Stomach; 15. Pancreas: 16. Accessory pancreatic duct; 17. Pancreatic duct; 18. Small intestine: 19. Duodenum; 20. Jejunum; 21–22. Right and left kidneys The front border of the liver has been lifted up (brown arrow).

The major duodenal papilla is situated in the second part of the duodenum, 7–10 cm from the pylorus, at the level of the second or third lumbar vertebrae. It is surrounded by the sphincter of Oddi, a circular muscle, and receives a mixture of pancreatic enzymes and bile from the Ampulla of Vater, which drains both the pancreatic duct and biliary system. The junction between the foregut and midgut occurs directly below the major duodenal papilla. The major duodenal papilla projects less than a centimetre into the lumen of the duodenum. It appears rounded and is often covered by a fold on the uppermost side of the papilla; that is, the side which receives contents from the stomach.

The major duodenal papilla is seen from the duodenum as lying within a mucosal fold. The minor duodenal papilla is situated 2 cm proximal.

=== Variation ===
The major duodenal papilla is occasionally found in the junction between the descending and horizontal parts of the duodenum, or in the horizontal part of the duodenum; a case study of 1000 people demonstrated this in 12 and 8% respectively. in the third part of the duodenum, the level of the vertebrae may be L2-3, and in about 10% of people, it may not receive bile. Additionally, in a small number of people, the primary papilla for draining the pancreas may in fact be the accessory pancreatic duct.

== Function ==
Pancreatic enzymes and bile drain into the duodenum from both the pancreatic duct and biliary system. This facilitates the digestion of food; particularly proteins (pancreatic enzymes), and fat-soluble vitamins (bile).

== Clinical significance ==
The minor papilla drains the duct of Santorini, superior in position to the major papilla. In pancreatic divisum, in which the minor papilla drains the bulk of pancreatic secretions and major drains a minority of secretions (opposite of normal), a Santorinicele may develop leading to obstructed secretions/reflux resulting in pancreatitis.

== History ==
The major duodenal papilla was first illustrated by Gottfreid Bidloo in 1685, although is sometimes called the papilla of Vater, after German anatomist Abraham Vater.

== See also ==
- Sphincter of Oddi
- Common bile duct
- Pancreatic duct
- Ampulla of Vater
