= Pancreas divisum =

Congenital disorder of digestive system

- Other names: Pancreatic divisum
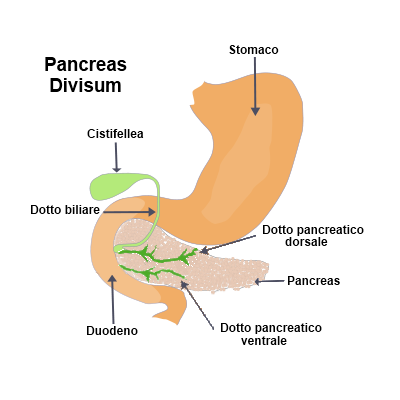
- Specialty: Medical genetics

Pancreas divisum is a congenital anomaly in the anatomy of the ducts of the pancreas in which a single pancreatic duct is not formed, but rather remains as two distinct dorsal and ventral ducts. Most individuals with pancreas divisum remain without symptoms or complications. A minority of people with pancreatic divisum may develop episodes of abdominal pain, nausea or vomiting due to acute or chronic pancreatitis. The presence of pancreas divisum is usually identified with cross sectional diagnostic imaging, such as endoscopic retrograde cholangiopancreatography (ERCP) or magnetic resonance cholangiopancreatography (MRCP). In some cases, it may be detected intraoperatively. If no symptoms or complications are present, then treatment is not necessary. However, if there is recurrent pancreatitis, then a sphincterotomy of the minor papilla may be indicated.

== Causes ==
The human embryo begins life with two ducts in the pancreas, the ventral duct and the dorsal duct. Normally, the two ducts will fuse together to form one main pancreatic duct; this occurs in more than 90% of embryos. In approximately 10% of embryos the ventral and dorsal ducts fail to fuse together, resulting in pancreas divisum. In utero, the majority of the pancreas is drained by the dorsal duct which opens up into the minor duodenal papilla. The ventral duct drains the minority of the pancreas and opens into the major duodenal papilla. In adults however, this situation is reversed whereby 70% of the pancreas is drained by the ventral duct. Therefore in pancreas divisum, where fusion of the ducts does not occur, the major drainage of the pancreas is done by the dorsal duct which opens up into the minor papilla.

== Diagnosis ==
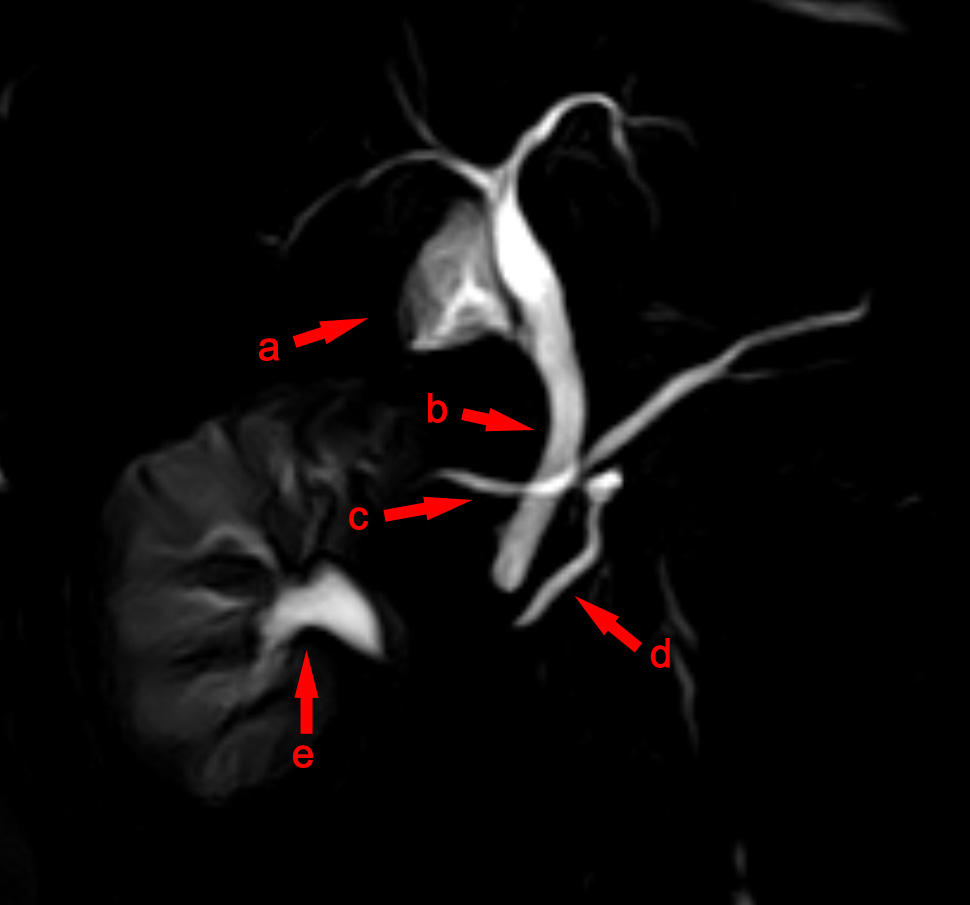
MRCP image of pancreas divisum.

The most common and accurate way of diagnosing an individual with this anomaly is by ERCP and MRCP. This test can demonstrate the presence of two separately draining ducts within the pancreas.

Pancreas divisum has been suggested as a potential contributor of chronic pancreatitis in certain cases. The separate ducts could lead to poor drainage of pancreatic secretions and increased pressure in the dorsal duct, increasing the risk of inflammation and the development of complications. As a result, pancreas divisum is found more commonly in patients with pancreatitis.

== Treatment ==
Pancreas divisum in individuals with no symptoms does not require treatment. For cases with mild and infrequent attacks, management may involve a low-fat diet, medications to reduce pain and gastrointestinal reactions, and pancreatic enzyme supplementation.

A surgeon may attempt a sphincterotomy by cutting the minor papilla to enlarge the opening and allow pancreatic enzymes to flow normally. During surgery, a stent may be inserted into the duct to ensure that the duct will not close causing a blockage. This surgery can cause pancreatitis in patients, or in rare cases, kidney failure and death. ERCP are sometimes used for symptomatic pancreas divisum, which offers the benefit of a less invasive approach compared with surgery. No large-scale clinical studies comparing surgical and endoscopic approaches are available.

== Occurrence ==
Studies involving autopsy and imaging series indicate that between 6% and 10% of the population have pancreas divisum, but it is asymptomatic in the majority (>95%) of cases. In those who develop symptoms, the symptoms seen in pancreas divisum and pancreatitis with typical anatomy are the same: abdominal pain is common, typically of sudden onset and located in the right upper quadrant of the abdomen and often accompanied by nausea and vomiting. Pancreatic pain is characteristically described as a constant, severe, dull, epigastric pain that often radiates to the back and typically worsens after high-fat meals. However, many different pain patterns have been described, ranging from no pain to recurrent episodes of pain and pain free intervals, to constant pain with clusters of severe exacerbations.
