= Ampulla of Vater =

Organ duct

- A diagram of the biliary system. Note that the ampulla of Vater is behind the major duodenal papilla.

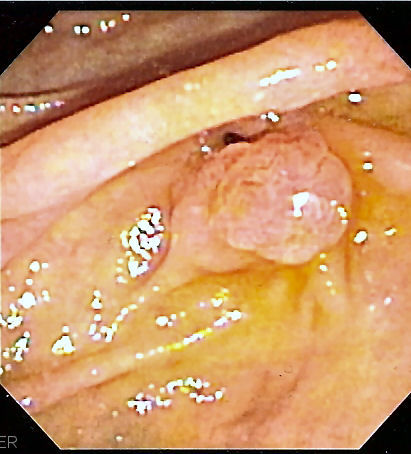
- The major duodenal papilla, seen on duodenoscopy at the time of ERCP. This is the protrusion of the ampulla of Vater into the duodenum.

Details

Identifiers
- Latin: ampulla hepatopancreatica, ampulla Vaterii
- MeSH: D014670
- TA98: A05.8.02.017
- TA2: 3111
- FMA: 15076

The ampulla of Vater, hepatopancreatic ampulla or hepatopancreatic duct is the common duct that is usually formed by a union of the common bile duct and the pancreatic duct within the wall of the duodenum. This common duct usually features a dilation ("ampulla"). The common duct then opens medially into the descending part of the duodenum at the major duodenal papilla. The common duct usually measures 2–10mm in length.

The ampulla of Vater is an important landmark halfway along the second part of the duodenum marking the transition from foregut to midgut.

== Structure ==
1. Bile ducts: 2. Intrahepatic bile ducts; 3. Left and right hepatic ducts; 4. Common hepatic duct; 5. Cystic duct; 6. Common bile duct; 7. Ampulla of Vater; 8. Major duodenal papilla; 9. Gallbladder; 10–11. Right and left lobes of liver: 12. Spleen; 13. Esophagus; 14. Stomach; 15. Pancreas: 16. Accessory pancreatic duct; 17. Pancreatic duct; 18. Small intestine: 19. Duodenum; 20. Jejunum; 21–22. Right and left kidneys The front border of the liver has been lifted up (brown arrow).

=== Sphincters ===
Various smooth muscle sphincters regulate the flow of bile and pancreatic juice through the ampulla: the sphincter of the pancreatic duct, the sphincter of the bile duct, and the sphincter of Oddi.

=== Variation ===
The common bile duct and pancreatic duct may sometimes unite outside the duodenal wall, creating an unusually long common duct. The two ducts may also drain into the duodenum separately, or may fuse yet retain their separate lumens separated by a septum.

== Clinical significance ==
Thomas' sign is the production of silver stools and can be indicative of cancer of the Ampulla of Vater. The ampulla of Vater is the site of tumors, often with a threatening prognosis and difficult surgical treatment. The silver-colored stool is a combination of the white stool of obstructive jaundice combined with black stool of melena or bleeding. It was first described in the British Medical Journal by Dr. H. Ogilvie in 1955.

Regarding bowel obstruction in humans, if the obstruction is distal to the ampulla of vater (distal to the second part of the duodenum), vomit may be bilious. This is particularly useful in the realms of paediatrics to distinguish more proximal causes such as pyloric stenosis, from bilious causes such as malrotation. Bilious vomit is differentiated by the green (usually dark/leafy) appearance of human bile, occurring after the stomach has been completely emptied.

== Etymology ==
The eponymic term "ampulla of Vater" is named after Abraham Vater (1684–1751), a German anatomist who first published a description of it in 1723. The eponymous nomenclature is debated among medical professionals, with some pointing out that Vater was far from the first to describe the structure. The term "hepatopancreatic ampulla" is often used to describe this structure and avoids the use of eponyms.

== Additional images ==
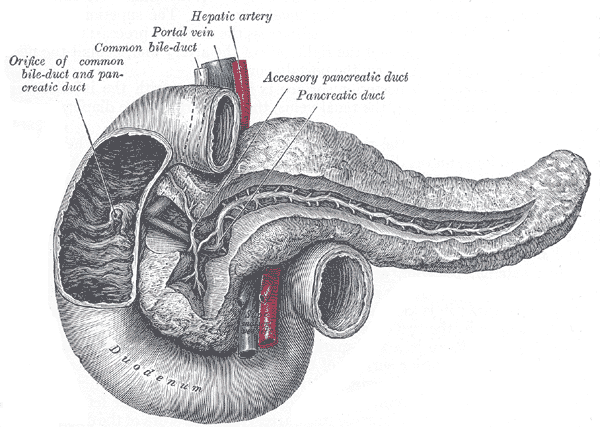
The pancreatic duct.

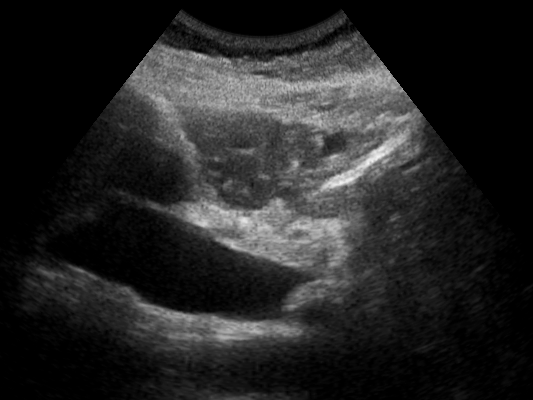
Carcinoma of Ampulla
