= Sphincter of Oddi =

Muscular valve in the duodenum

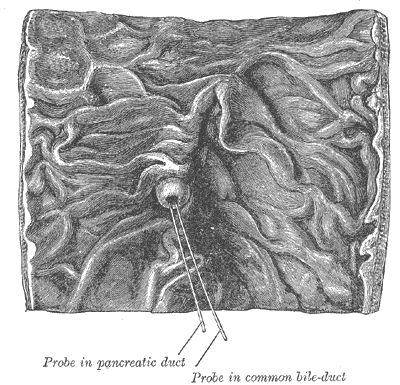
- Interior of the descending portion of the duodenum, showing bile papilla

Details
- System: Digestive system
- Location: Surrounds the Major duodenal papilla
- Function: A circular muscle (sphincter) that controls the secretion of pancreatic juices and bile into the duodenum, and prevents reflux from the duodenum.

Identifiers
- Latin: m. sphincter ampullae
- Acronym: SO
- MeSH: D009803
- TA98: A05.8.02.018
- TA2: 3112
- FMA: 15077

The sphincter of Oddi (SO) (also hepatopancreatic sphincter or Glisson's sphincter), is a sphincter, a muscular valve that, in humans and some animals, controls the flow of bile and pancreatic juice out of the gallbladder and pancreas respectively through the ampulla of Vater into the second part of the duodenum. It is named after Ruggero Oddi.

== Structure ==
The sphincter of Oddi is a circular muscle band, or sphincter that surrounds the major duodenal papilla.

== Function ==
The sphincter regulates the secretion of pancreatic juice and bile into the duodenum. It also prevents reflux of duodenal contents into the ampulla of Vater. By preventing reflux of the contents of the duodenum, the sphincter of Oddi prevents the accumulation of particulate matter and sludge in the bile ducts, reducing the risk of cholangitis. The sphincter of Oddi also allows retrograde filling of the gallbladder.

The sphincter of Oddi is relaxed by the hormone cholecystokinin via vasoactive intestinal peptide.

== Clinical significance ==
Pancreatitis can result from a failure of pancreatic secretions to drain properly. One possible cause of impaired drainage of pancreatic juice is blockage of the sphincter of Oddi. A common cause of blockage is a gallstone in the common bile duct.

Opiates may cause spasms of the sphincter of Oddi, leading to increased serum amylase levels.

== History ==
The sphincter was described for the first time by Ruggero Oddi when he was a young student in 1887. This description followed extensive research into the physiology of dogs and detailed histological examinations of humans and many other species.

== Other animals ==
In many mammals (including mice, guinea pigs, dogs, and opossums), the smooth muscle around the ampulla of Vater does not form a sphincter.
