= Minor duodenal papilla =

Details

Identifiers
- Latin: papilla duodeni minor
- TA98: A05.6.02.016
- TA2: 2956
- FMA: 15075

The minor duodenal papilla is the opening of the accessory pancreatic duct into the descending second section of the duodenum.

== Structure ==
The minor duodenal papilla is contained within the second part of the duodenum. It is situated 2 cm proximal to the major duodenal papilla, and thus 5–8 cm from the opening of the pylorus. The gastroduodenal artery lies posterior.

=== Variation ===
The minor duodenal papilla may or may not contain a functioning sphincter and patent duct. When present, the sphincter is known as the sphincter of Helly, and the duct as the accessory pancreatic duct of Santorini. In 10% of people, the minor duodenal papilla is the prime duct for drainage of the pancreas, although in others it may not be present at all.

Pain from the region will be referred to the epigastric region of the abdomen due to its associated dermatomes.

== Function ==
The duct is an embryological remnant, however in a small majority of people drains the pancreas. It is present in several domestic animals (e.g., dogs, cats and horses), being the sole drain of the pancreas in pigs and cows through the ductus pancreaticus accessorius.

=== Development ===
The minor duodenal papilla represents the remnants of the opening of the accessory pancreatic duct, which drains the dorsal pancreatic bud during foetal development.

== Clinical significance ==
When patent, the minor duodenal papilla may be associated with recurrent pancreatitis. This is particularly common in a subset of people, when the dorsal pancreatic bud fails to fuse with the ventral pancreatic bud, a condition called pancreatic divisum, or when patent and ligated.

== History ==
Another name for the minor duodenal papilla is Santorini's minor caruncle.
