= Pancreas =

Organ of the digestive system and endocrine system of vertebrates

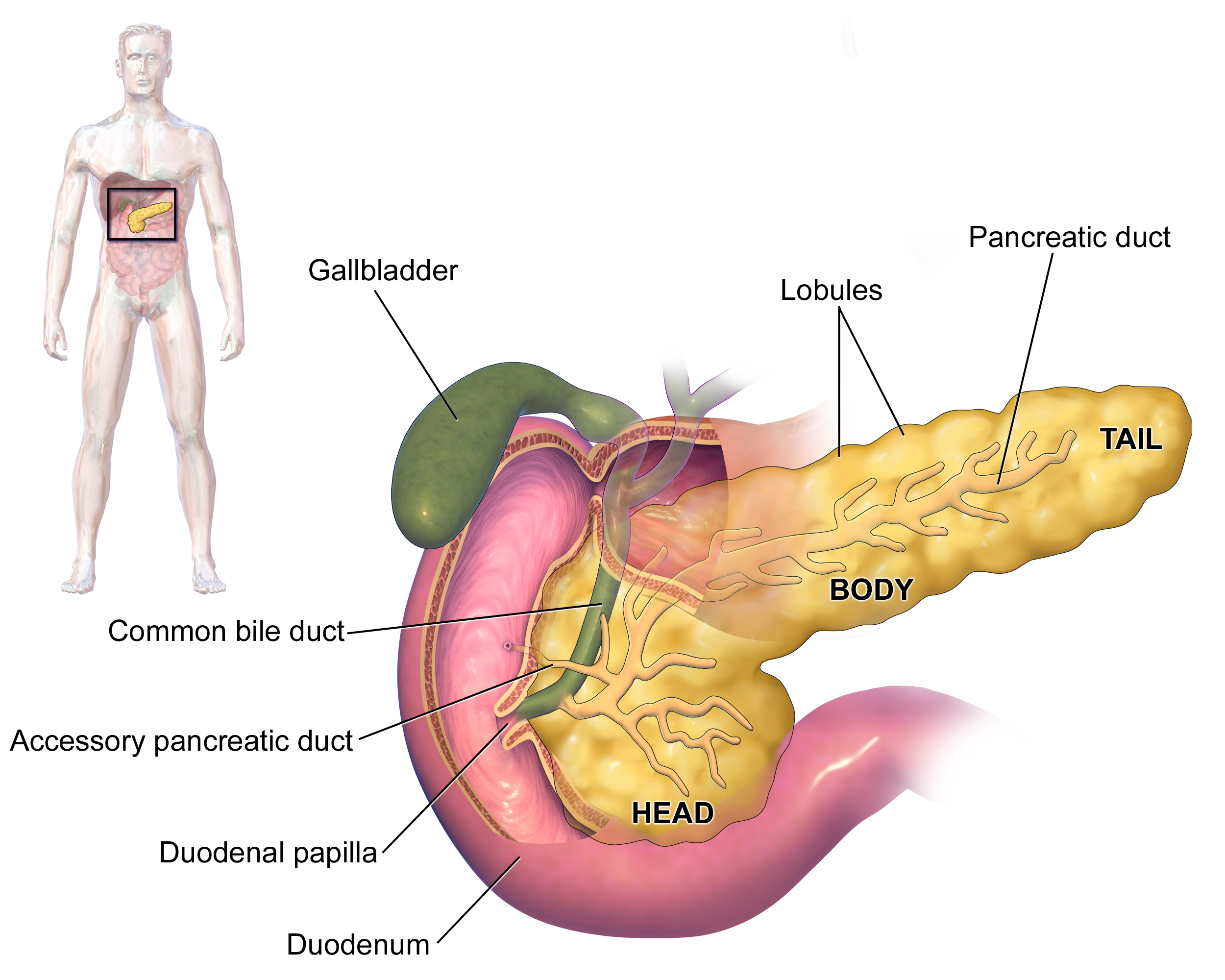
- Anatomy of the human pancreas

Details
- Pronunciation: /ˈpæŋkriəs/
- Precursor: Pancreatic buds
- System: Digestive system and endocrine system
- Artery: Inferior pancreaticoduodenal artery, anterior superior pancreaticoduodenal artery, posterior superior pancreaticoduodenal artery, splenic artery
- Vein: Pancreaticoduodenal veins, pancreatic veins
- Nerve: Pancreatic plexus, celiac ganglia, vagus nerve
- Lymph: Splenic lymph nodes, celiac lymph nodes and superior mesenteric lymph nodes

Identifiers
- Latin: pancreas
- Greek: πάγκρεας (pánkreas)
- MeSH: D010179
- TA98: A05.9.01.001
- TA2: 3114
- FMA: 7198

The pancreas (plural pancreases, or pancreata) is an organ of the digestive system and endocrine system of vertebrates. In humans, it is located in the abdomen behind the stomach and functions as a gland. The pancreas is a mixed or heterocrine gland, i.e., it has both an endocrine and a digestive exocrine function. Ninety-nine percent of the pancreas is exocrine and one percent is endocrine. As an endocrine gland, it functions mostly to regulate blood sugar levels, secreting the hormones insulin, glucagon, somatostatin and pancreatic polypeptide. As a part of the digestive system, it functions as an exocrine gland secreting pancreatic juice into the duodenum through the pancreatic duct. This juice contains bicarbonate, which neutralizes acid entering the duodenum from the stomach, and digestive enzymes which break down carbohydrates, proteins, and fats in food entering the duodenum from the stomach.

Inflammation of the pancreas is known as pancreatitis; common causes include chronic alcohol use and gallstones. Because of its role in the regulation of blood sugar, the pancreas is also a key organ in diabetes. Pancreatic cancer can arise following chronic pancreatitis or due to other reasons, and it carries a very poor prognosis, as it is often identified only after it has spread to other areas of the body.

The word pancreas comes from the Greek πᾶν (pân, "all") & κρέας (kréas, "flesh"). The function of the pancreas in diabetes has been known since at least 1889, with its role in insulin production identified in 1921.

== Structure ==
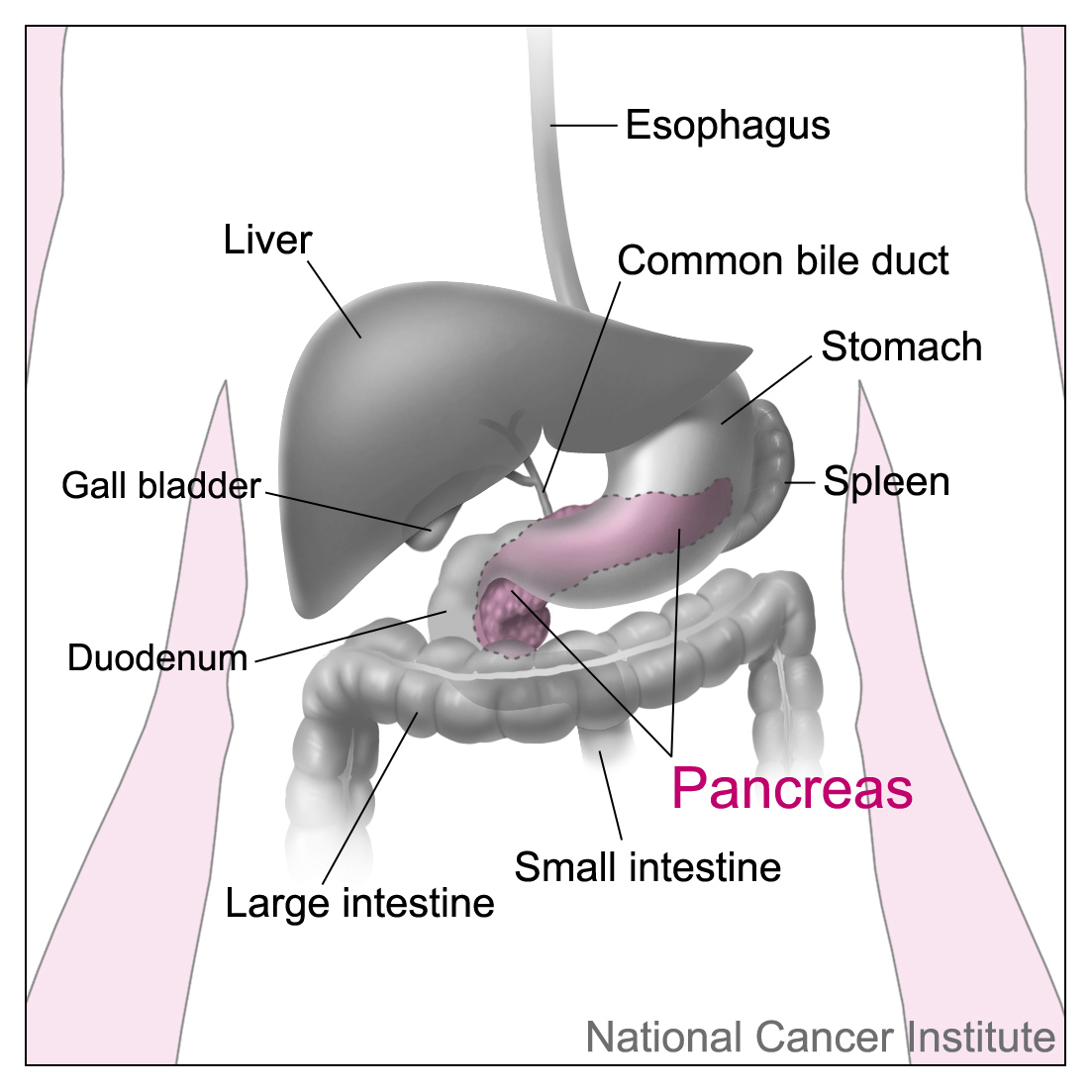
The pancreas (shown here in pink) sits behind the stomach, with the body near the curvature of the duodenum, and the tail stretching to touch the spleen.

The pancreas is an organ that in humans lies in the abdomen, stretching from behind the stomach to the left upper abdomen near the spleen. In adults, it is about 12–15 centimetres (4.7–5.9 in) long, lobulated, and salmon-coloured in appearance.

Anatomically, the pancreas is typically leaf-shaped, divided into a head, neck, body, and tail. The pancreas stretches from the inner curvature of the duodenum, where the head surrounds two blood vessels: the superior mesenteric artery and vein. The longest part of the pancreas, the body, stretches across behind the stomach, and the tail of the pancreas ends adjacent to the spleen.

Two ducts, the main pancreatic duct and a smaller accessory pancreatic duct, run through the body of the pancreas. The main pancreatic duct joins with the common bile duct, forming a small balloon called the ampulla of Vater (hepatopancreatic ampulla). This ampulla is surrounded by a muscle, the sphincter of Oddi. This ampulla opens into the descending part of the duodenum. The opening of the common bile duct into the main pancreatic duct is controlled by the sphincter of Boyden. The accessory pancreatic duct opens into duodenum with separate openings located above the opening of the main pancreatic duct.

=== Parts ===
The head of the pancreas sits within the curvature of the duodenum and wraps around the superior mesenteric artery and vein. To the right sits the descending part of the duodenum, and between these travel the superior and inferior pancreaticoduodenal arteries. Behind rest the inferior vena cava and the common bile duct. In front sit the peritoneal membrane and the transverse colon. A small uncinate process emerges from below the head, situated behind the superior mesenteric vein and sometimes artery. A pancreatic notch is a separation between the neck of the pancreas and the uncinate process.

The neck of the pancreas separates the head of the pancreas, located in the curvature of the duodenum, from the body. The neck is about 2 cm (0.79 in) wide and sits in front of where the portal vein is formed. The neck lies mostly behind the pylorus of the stomach and is covered with peritoneum. The anterior superior pancreaticoduodenal artery travels in front of the neck of the pancreas.

The body of the pancreas is the largest part of the pancreas and mostly lies behind the stomach, tapering along its length. The peritoneum sits on top of the body of the pancreas, and the transverse colon in front of the peritoneum. Behind the pancreas are several blood vessels, including the aorta, the splenic vein, and the left renal vein, as well as the beginning of the superior mesenteric artery. Below the body of the pancreas sits some of the small intestine, specifically the last part of the duodenum and the jejunum to which it connects, as well as the suspensory ligament of the duodenum, which falls between these two. In front of the pancreas sits the transverse colon.

The pancreas narrows towards the tail of the pancreas, which sits near the spleen. It is usually between 1.3–3.5 cm (0.51–1.38 in) long and sits between the layers of the ligament between the spleen and the left kidney. The splenic artery and vein pass behind the body and tail of the pancreas.

=== Blood supply ===
The pancreas has a rich blood supply, with vessels originating as branches of both the coeliac artery and superior mesenteric artery. The splenic artery, the largest branch of the celiac trunk, runs along the top of the pancreas and supplies the left part of the body and the tail of the pancreas through its pancreatic branches, the largest of which is called the greater pancreatic artery. The superior and inferior pancreaticoduodenal arteries run along the back and front surfaces of the head of the pancreas adjacent to the duodenum. These supply the head of the pancreas. These vessels join together (anastomose) in the middle.

The body and neck of the pancreas drain into the splenic vein, which sits behind the pancreas. The head drains into, and wraps around, the superior mesenteric and portal veins, via the pancreaticoduodenal veins.

The pancreas drains into lymphatic vessels that travel alongside its arteries, and it has a rich lymphatic supply. The lymphatic vessels of the body and tail drain into splenic lymph nodes, and eventually into lymph nodes that lie in front of the aorta, between the coeliac and superior mesenteric arteries. The lymphatic vessels of the head and neck drain into intermediate lymphatic vessels around the pancreaticoduodenal, mesenteric and hepatic arteries, and from there into the lymph nodes that lie in front of the aorta.

=== Microanatomy ===
This image shows a pancreatic islet when pancreatic tissue is stained and viewed under a microscope. Parts of the digestive ("exocrine") pancreas can be seen around the islet, more darkly. These contain hazy dark purple granules of inactive digestive enzymes (zymogens).

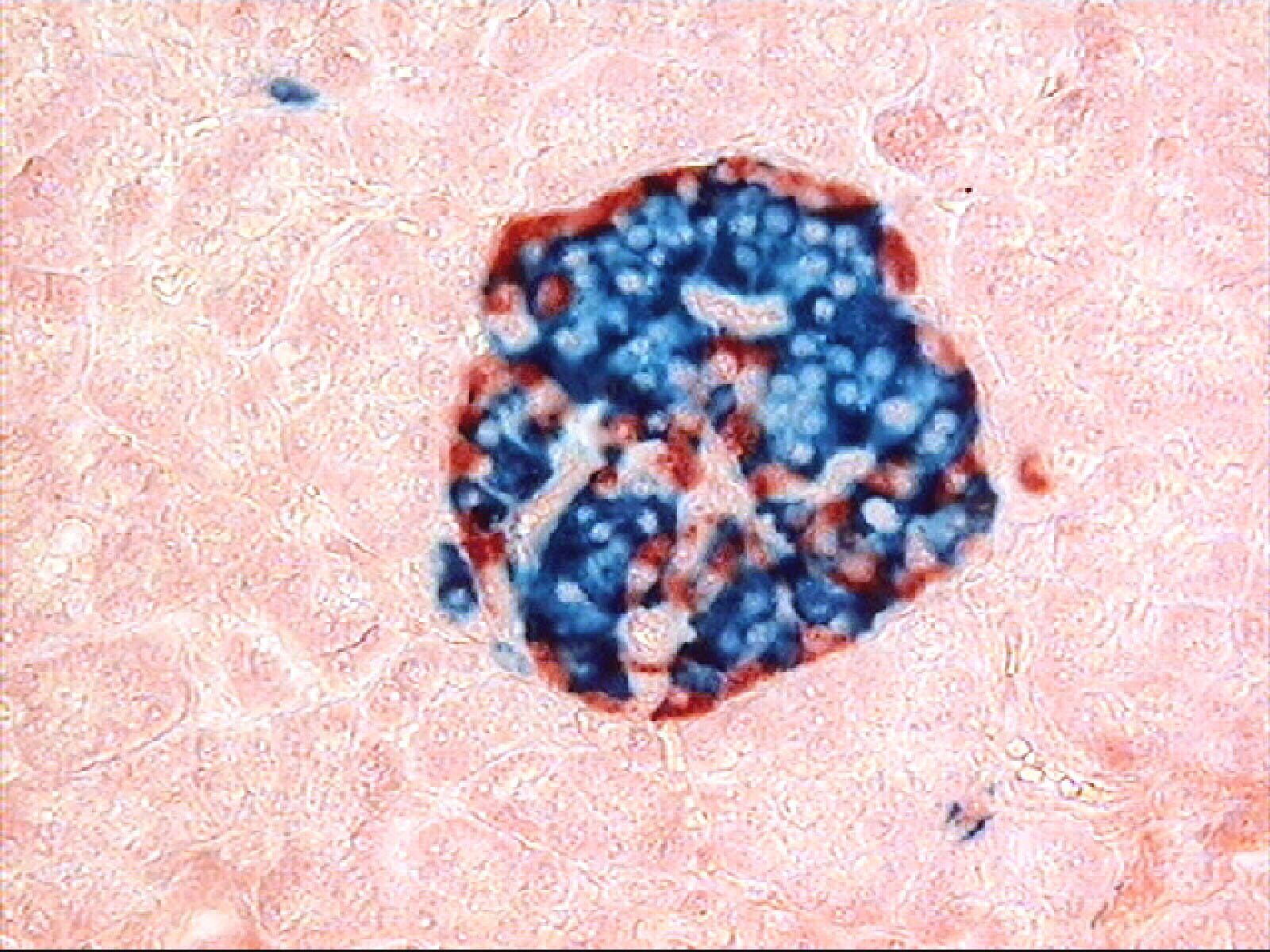
An image using immunohistochemistry to show the location of different cell types in the pancreatic islet. Antibodies against glucagon (red-brown), secreted by alpha cells, show their peripheral position. Antibodies against insulin (blue), secreted by beta cells, show the more widespread and central position that these cells tend to have.

The pancreas contains tissues with both an endocrine and exocrine role. This division is visible when the pancreas is viewed under a microscope.

The majority of pancreatic tissue has a digestive role. The cells with this role form clusters (acini) around small ducts and are arranged in lobes that have thin fibrous walls. The cells of each acinus (called acinar cells) secrete inactive digestive enzymes called zymogens into the small intercalated ducts which they surround. In each acinus, the cells are pyramid-shaped and situated around the intercalated ducts, with the nuclei resting on the basement membrane, a large endoplasmic reticulum, and some zymogen granules visible within the cytoplasm. The intercalated ducts drain into larger intralobular ducts within the lobule, and finally interlobular ducts. The ducts are lined by a single layer of column-shaped cells. There is more than one layer of cells as the diameter of the ducts increases.

The tissues with an endocrine role within the pancreas exist as clusters of cells called pancreatic islets (also called islets of Langerhans) that are distributed throughout the pancreas. Pancreatic islets contain alpha cells, beta cells, and delta cells, each of which releases a different hormone. These cells have characteristic positions, with alpha cells (secreting glucagon) tending to be situated around the periphery of the islet, and beta cells (secreting insulin) more numerous and found throughout the islet. Enterochromaffin cells are also scattered throughout the islets. Islets are composed of up to 3,000 secretory cells, and contain several small arterioles to receive blood, and venules that allow the hormones secreted by the cells to enter the systemic circulation.

=== Variation ===
The size of the pancreas varies considerably. Several anatomical variations exist, relating to the embryological development of the two pancreatic buds. The pancreas develops from these buds on either side of the duodenum. The ventral bud rotates to lie next to the dorsal bud, eventually fusing. In about 10% of adults, an accessory pancreatic duct may be present if the main duct of the dorsal bud of the pancreas does not regress; this duct opens into the minor duodenal papilla. If the two buds themselves, each having a duct, do not fuse, a pancreas may exist with two separate ducts, a condition known as a pancreas divisum. This condition has no physiologic consequence. If the ventral bud does not fully rotate, an annular pancreas may exist, where the pancreas encircles part or all of the duodenum. This may be associated with duodenal atresia.

=== Gene and protein expression ===
10,000 protein-coding genes (~50% of all human genes) are expressed in the normal human pancreas. Less than 100 of these genes are specifically expressed in the pancreas. Similar to the salivary glands, most pancreas-specific genes encode for secreted proteins. Corresponding pancreas-specific proteins are either expressed in the exocrine cellular compartment and have functions related to digestion or food uptake such as digestive chymotrypsinogen enzymes and pancreatic lipase PNLIP, or are expressed in the various cells of the endocrine pancreatic islets and have functions related to secreted hormones such as insulin, glucagon, somatostatin and pancreatic polypeptide.

== Development ==
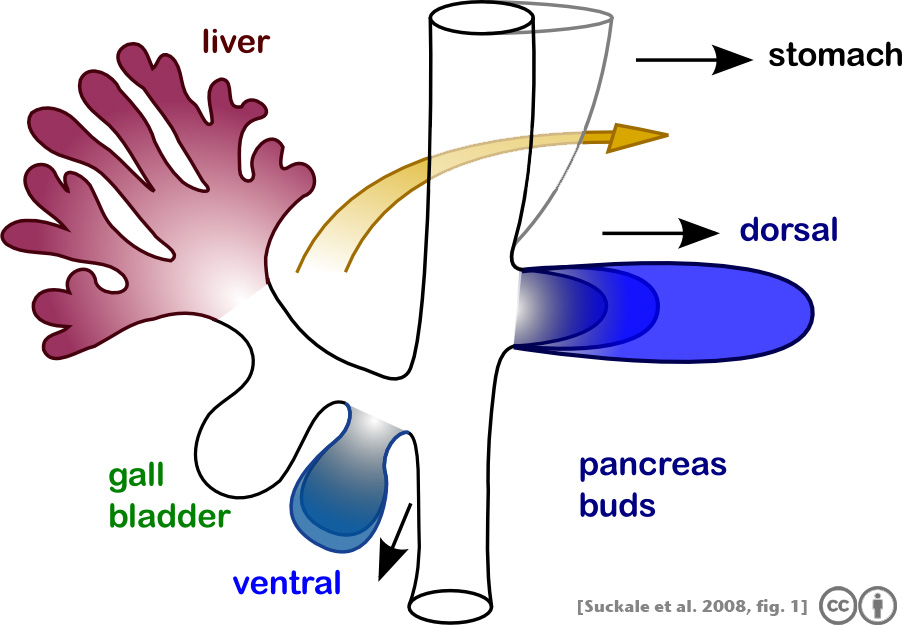
The pancreas originates from the foregut, a precursor tube to part of the digestive tract, as a dorsal and ventral bud. As it develops, the ventral bud rotates to the other side, and the two buds fuse.

The pancreas forms during development from two pancreatic buds that arise from the duodenal part of the foregut, an embryonic tube that is a precursor to the gastrointestinal tract. It is of endodermal origin. Pancreatic development begins with the formation of a dorsal and ventral pancreatic bud. Each joins with the foregut through a duct. The dorsal pancreatic bud forms the neck, body, and tail of the developed pancreas, and the ventral pancreatic bud forms the head and uncinate process.

The definitive pancreas results from the rotation of the ventral bud and the fusion of the two buds. During development, the duodenum rotates to the right, and the ventral bud rotates with it, moving to a position that becomes more dorsal. Upon reaching its final destination, the ventral pancreatic bud is below the larger dorsal bud and eventually fuses with it. At this point of fusion, the main ducts of the ventral and dorsal pancreatic buds fuse, forming the main pancreatic duct. Usually, the duct of the dorsal bud regresses, leaving the main pancreatic duct.

=== Cellular development ===
Pancreatic progenitor cells are precursor cells that differentiate into the functional pancreatic cells, including exocrine acinar and ductal cells, and endocrine islet cells. These progenitor cells are characterised by the co-expression of the transcription factors PDX1 and NKX6-1.

The cells of the exocrine pancreas differentiate through molecules that induce differentiation including follistatin, fibroblast growth factors, and activation of the Notch receptor system. Development of the exocrine acini progresses through three successive stages. These are the predifferentiated, protodifferentiated, and differentiated stages, which correspond to undetectable, low, and high levels of digestive enzyme activity, respectively.

Pancreatic progenitor cells differentiate into endocrine islet cells under the influence of neurogenin-3 and ISL1, but only in the absence of notch receptor signaling. Under the direction of a Pax gene, the endocrine precursor cells differentiate to form alpha and gamma cells. Under the direction of Pax-6, the endocrine precursor cells differentiate to form beta and delta cells. The pancreatic islets form as the endocrine cells migrate from the duct system to form small clusters around capillaries. This occurs around the third month of development, and insulin and glucagon can be detected in the human fetal circulation by the fourth or fifth month of development.

== Function ==
The pancreas is involved in blood sugar control and metabolism within the body and also in the secretion of substances (collectively pancreatic juice) that help digestion. These functions are divided into an endocrine role, relating to the secretion of insulin and other hormones within pancreatic islets that help control blood sugar levels and metabolism, and an exocrine role, relating to the secretion of pancreatic digestive enzymes.

=== Blood glucose regulation ===
The pancreas maintains constant blood glucose levels (shown as the waving line). When the blood glucose level is too high, the pancreas secretes insulin. If the level is too low, the pancreas secretes glucagon.

Cells within the pancreas help to maintain blood glucose levels (homeostasis). The cells that do this are located within the pancreatic islets that are present throughout the pancreas. The following processes take place with blood glucose levels:

- When blood glucose levels are low, alpha cells secrete glucagon, which increases blood glucose levels.
- When blood glucose levels are high beta cells secrete insulin to decrease glucose in blood.

Delta cells in the islet also secrete somatostatin which decreases the release of insulin and glucagon.

Glucagon acts to increase glucose levels by promoting the creation of glucose and the breakdown of glycogen to glucose in the liver. It also decreases glucose uptake in fat and muscle. Glucagon release is stimulated by low blood glucose or insulin levels, and during exercise.

Insulin acts to decrease blood glucose levels by facilitating uptake by cells (particularly skeletal muscle), and promoting its use in the creation of proteins, fats, and carbohydrates. Insulin is initially created as a precursor form called preproinsulin. This is converted to proinsulin and cleaved by C-peptide to insulin, which is then stored in granules in beta cells. Glucose is taken into the beta cells and degraded. The end effect of this is to cause depolarisation of the cell membrane, which stimulates the release of insulin.

The main factor influencing the secretion of insulin and glucagon is the levels of glucose in blood plasma. Low blood sugar stimulates glucagon release, and high blood sugar stimulates insulin release. Other factors also influence the secretion of these hormones. Some amino acids, which are byproducts of the digestion of protein, stimulate insulin and glucagon release. Somatostatin acts as an inhibitor of both insulin and glucagon. The autonomic nervous system also plays a role. Activation of Beta-2 receptors of the sympathetic nervous system by catecholamines secreted from sympathetic nerves stimulates secretion of insulin and glucagon, whereas activation of Alpha-1 receptors inhibits secretion. M3 receptors of the parasympathetic nervous system act when stimulated by the right vagus nerve to stimulate release of insulin from beta cells.

=== Digestion ===
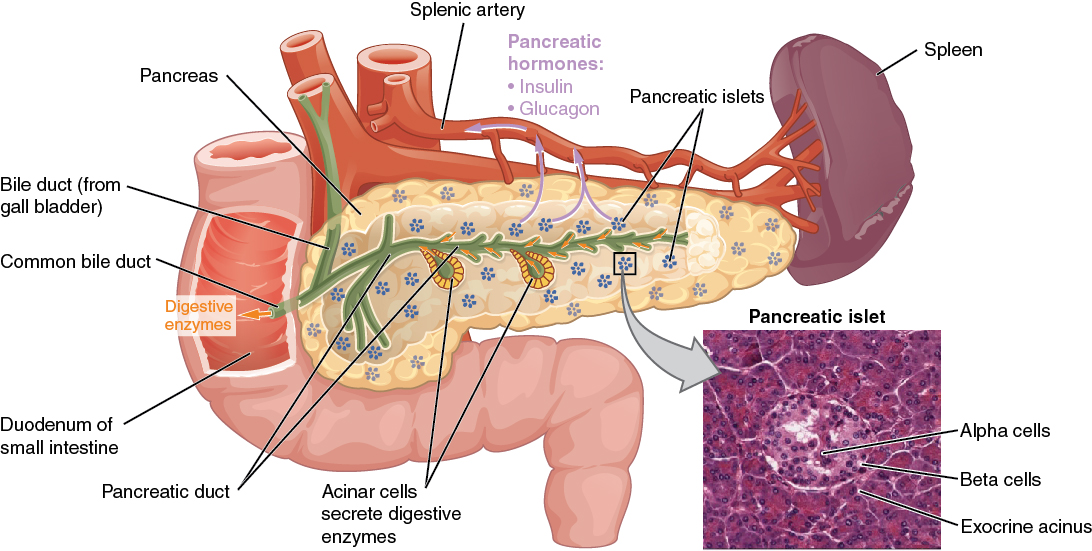
The pancreas has a role in digestion, highlighted here. Ducts in the pancreas (green) conduct digestive enzymes into the duodenum. This image also shows a pancreatic islet, part of the endocrine pancreas, which contains cells responsible for the secretion of insulin and glucagon.

The pancreas plays a vital role in the digestive system. It does this by secreting pancreatic juice, a fluid that contains digestive enzymes, into the duodenum, the first part of the small intestine that receives food from the stomach. These enzymes help to break down carbohydrates, proteins and lipids (fats). This is the exocrine role of the pancreas. The cells responsible for this are acinar cells arranged in clusters called acini. Secretions into the middle of the acinus accumulate in intralobular ducts, which drain to the main pancreatic duct, which drains directly into the duodenum. About 1.5–3 liters of fluid are secreted in this manner every day.

The cells in each acinus are filled with granules containing the digestive enzymes. These are secreted in an inactive form termed zymogens or proenzymes. When released into the duodenum, they are activated by the enzyme enterokinase present in the lining of the duodenum. The proenzymes are cleaved, creating a cascade of activating enzymes.

- Enzymes that break down proteins begin with activation of trypsinogen to trypsin. The free trypsin then cleaves the rest of the trypsinogen, as well as chymotrypsinogen to its active form chymotrypsin.
- Enzymes secreted involved in the digestion of fats include lipase, phospholipase A2, lysophospholipase, and cholesterol esterase.
- Enzymes that break down starch and other carbohydrates include amylase.

These enzymes are secreted in a fluid rich in bicarbonate. Bicarbonate helps maintain an alkaline pH for the fluid, a pH in which most of the enzymes act most efficiently, and also helps to neutralise the stomach acids that enter the duodenum. Secretion is influenced by hormones including secretin, cholecystokinin, and VIP, as well as acetylcholine stimulation from the vagus nerve. Secretin is released from the S cells, which form part of the lining of the duodenum in response to stimulation by gastric acid. Along with VIP, it increases the secretion of enzymes and bicarbonate. Cholecystokinin is released from Ito cells of the lining of the duodenum and jejunum, mostly in response to long-chain fatty acids, and increases the effects of secretin. At a cellular level, bicarbonate is secreted from centroacinar and ductal cells through a sodium and bicarbonate cotransporter that acts because of membrane depolarisation caused by the cystic fibrosis transmembrane conductance regulator. Secretin and VIP act to increase the opening of the cystic fibrosis transmembrane conductance regulator, which leads to more membrane depolarisation and more secretion of bicarbonate.

A variety of mechanisms act to ensure that the digestive action of the pancreas does not act to digest pancreatic tissue itself. These include the secretion of inactive enzymes (zymogens), the secretion of the protective enzyme trypsin inhibitor, which inactivates trypsin, the changes in pH that occur with bicarbonate secretion that stimulate digestion only when the pancreas is stimulated, and the fact that the low calcium within cells causes inactivation of trypsin.

=== Additional functions ===
The pancreas also secretes vasoactive intestinal peptide and pancreatic polypeptide. Enterochromaffin cells of the pancreas secrete the hormones motilin, serotonin, and substance P. It has been demonstrated that pancreatic tissue is a strong accumulator and secretor of radioactive cesium into the intestine (Cs-137).

== Clinical significance ==
=== Inflammation ===
Inflammation of the pancreas is known as pancreatitis. Pancreatitis is most often associated with recurrent gallstones or chronic alcohol use, with other common causes including traumatic damage, damage following an ERCP, some medications, infections such as mumps, and very high blood triglyceride levels. Acute pancreatitis is likely to cause intense pain in the central abdomen, which often radiates to the back, and may be associated with nausea or vomiting. Severe pancreatitis may lead to bleeding or perforation of the pancreas, resulting in shock or a systemic inflammatory response syndrome, bruising of the flanks or the region around the belly button. These severe complications are often managed in an intensive care unit.

In pancreatitis, enzymes of the exocrine pancreas damage the structure and tissue of the pancreas. Detection of some of these enzymes, such as amylase and lipase in the blood, along with symptoms and findings on medical imaging such as ultrasound or a CT scan, is often used to indicate that a person has pancreatitis. Pancreatitis is often managed medically with pain relief, and monitoring to prevent or manage shock, and management of any identified underlying causes. This may include removal of gallstones, lowering of blood triglyceride or glucose levels, the use of corticosteroids for autoimmune pancreatitis, and the cessation of any medication triggers.

Chronic pancreatitis refers to the development of pancreatitis over time. It shares many similar causes, with the most common being chronic alcohol use, with other causes including recurrent acute episodes and cystic fibrosis. Abdominal pain, characteristically relieved by sitting forward or drinking alcohol, is the most common symptom. When the digestive function of the pancreas is severely affected, this may lead to problems with fat digestion and the development of steatorrhoea; when the endocrine function is affected, this may lead to diabetes. Chronic pancreatitis is investigated in a similar way to acute pancreatitis. In addition to management of pain and nausea, and management of any identified causes (which may include alcohol cessation), because of the digestive role of the pancreas, enzyme replacement may be needed to prevent malabsorption.

=== Cancer ===
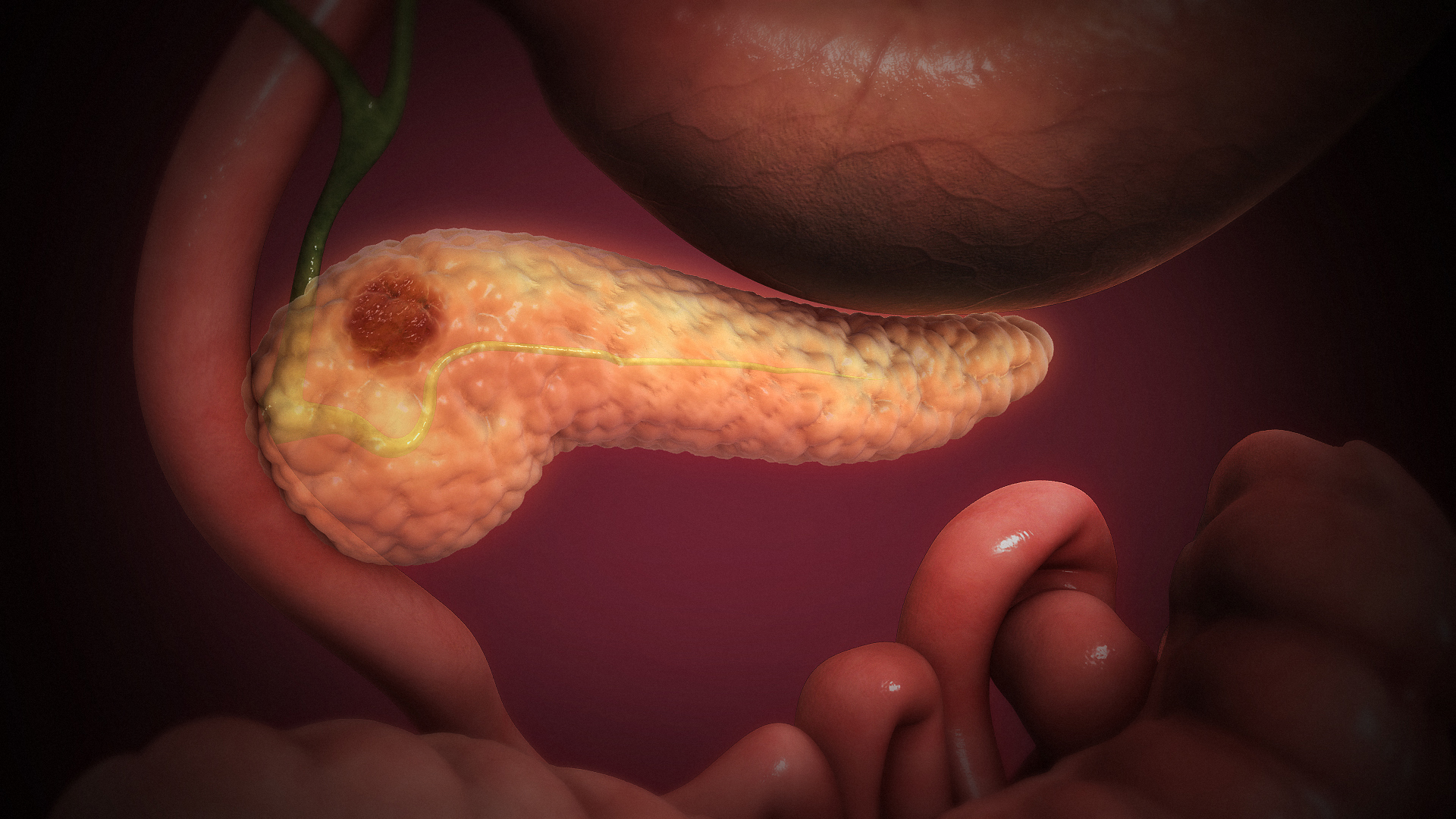
Pancreatic cancer, shown here, most commonly occurs as an adenocarcinoma in the head of the pancreas. Because symptoms (such as skin yellowing, pain, or itch) do not occur until later in the disease, it often presents at a later stage and has limited treatment options.

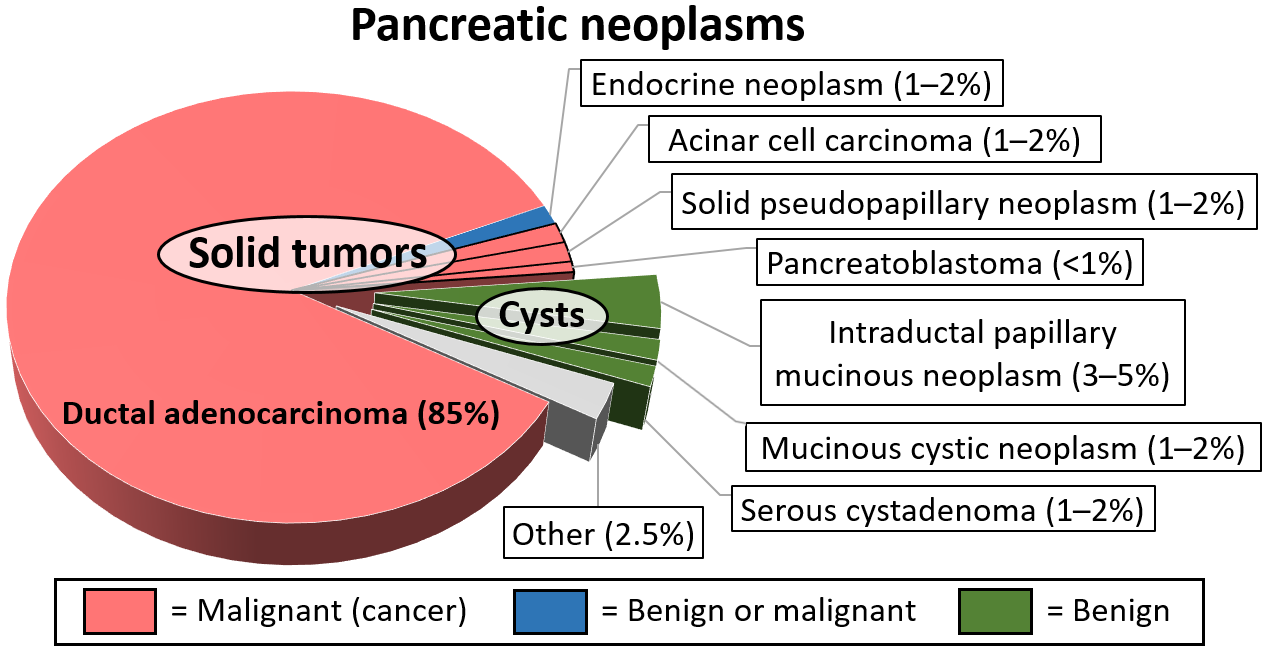
Relative incidences of various pancreatic neoplasms, with pancreatic cancers in red/pink color.

Pancreatic cancers, particularly the most common type, pancreatic adenocarcinoma, remain very difficult to treat, and are mostly diagnosed only at a stage that is too late for surgery, which is the only curative treatment. Pancreatic cancer is rare in people younger than 40 and the median age of diagnosis is 71. Risk factors include chronic pancreatitis, older age, smoking, obesity, diabetes, and certain rare genetic conditions including multiple endocrine neoplasia type 1, hereditary nonpolyposis colon cancer and dysplastic nevus syndrome among others. About 25% of cases are attributable to tobacco smoking, while 5–10% of cases are linked to inherited genes.

Pancreatic adenocarcinoma is the most common form of pancreatic cancer and is a cancer arising from the exocrine digestive part of the pancreas. Most occur in the head of the pancreas. Symptoms tend to arise late in the course of the cancer, when it causes abdominal pain, weight loss, or yellowing of the skin (jaundice). Jaundice occurs when the cancer blocks the outflow of bile. Other less common symptoms include nausea, vomiting, pancreatitis, diabetes, or recurrent venous thrombosis. Pancreatic cancer is usually diagnosed by medical imaging in the form of an ultrasound or CT scan with contrast enhancement. An endoscopic ultrasound may be used if a tumour is being considered for surgical removal, and biopsy guided by ERCP or ultrasound can be used to confirm an uncertain diagnosis.

Because of the late development of symptoms, most cancer presents at an advanced stage. Only 10 to 15% of tumours are suitable for surgical resection. As of 2018, when chemotherapy is given the FOLFIRINOX regimen containing fluorouracil, irinotecan, oxaliplatin and leucovorin has been shown to extend survival beyond traditional gemcitabine regimens. For the most part, treatment is palliative, focusing on the management of symptoms that develop. This may include management of itch, a choledochojejunostomy, or the insertion of stents with ERCP to facilitate the drainage of bile, and medications to help control pain. In the United States, pancreatic cancer is the fourth most common cause of death due to cancer. The disease occurs more often in the developed world, which had 68% of new cases in 2012. Pancreatic adenocarcinoma typically has poor outcomes, with the average percentage alive for at least one and five years after diagnosis being 25% and 5% respectively. In localized disease where the cancer is small (< 2 cm) the number alive at five years is approximately 20%.

There are several types of pancreatic cancer, involving both the endocrine and exocrine tissue. The many types of pancreatic endocrine tumors are all uncommon or rare, and have varied outlooks. However, the incidence of these cancers has been rising sharply; it is not clear to what extent this reflects increased detection, especially through medical imaging, of tumors that would be very slow to develop. Insulinomas (largely benign) and gastrinomas are the most common types. For those with neuroendocrine cancers the number alive after five years is much better at 65%, varying considerably with type.

A solid pseudopapillary tumour is a low-grade malignant tumour of the pancreas of papillary architecture that typically afflicts young women.

=== Diabetes mellitus ===
==== Type 1 diabetes ====
Diabetes mellitus type 1 is a chronic autoimmune disease in which the immune system attacks the insulin-secreting beta cells of the pancreas. Insulin is needed to keep blood sugar levels within optimal ranges, and its lack can lead to high blood sugar. As an untreated chronic condition, complications including accelerated vascular disease, diabetic retinopathy, kidney disease and neuropathy can result. In addition, if there is not enough insulin for glucose to be used within cells, the medical emergency diabetic ketoacidosis, which is often the first symptom that a person with type 1 diabetes may have, can result. Type 1 diabetes can develop at any age but is most often diagnosed before age 40. For people living with type 1 diabetes, insulin injections are critical for survival. An experimental procedure to treat type 1 diabetes is pancreas transplantation or isolated transplantation of islet cells to supply a person with functioning beta cells.

==== Type 2 diabetes ====
Diabetes mellitus type 2 is the most common form of diabetes. The causes for high blood sugar in this form of diabetes usually are a combination of insulin resistance and impaired insulin secretion, with both genetic and environmental factors playing a role in the development of the disease. Over time, pancreatic beta cells may become "exhausted" and less functional. The management of type 2 diabetes involves a combination of lifestyle measures, medications if required and potentially insulin. With relevance to the pancreas, several medications act to enhance the secretion of insulin from beta cells, particularly sulphonylureas, which act directly on beta cells; incretins which replicate the action of the hormones glucagon-like peptide 1, increasing the secretion of insulin from beta cells after meals, and are more resistant to breakdown; and DPP-4 inhibitors, which slow the breakdown of incretins.

=== Removal ===
It is possible for a person to live without a pancreas, provided that the person takes insulin for proper regulation of blood glucose concentration and pancreatic enzyme supplements to aid digestion.

== History ==
The pancreas was first identified by Herophilus (335–280 BC), a Greek anatomist and surgeon. A few hundred years later, Rufus of Ephesus, another Greek anatomist, gave the pancreas its name. Etymologically, the term "pancreas", a modern Latin adaptation of Greek πάγκρεας, [πᾶν ("all", "whole"), and κρέας ("flesh")], originally means sweetbread, although literally meaning all-flesh, presumably because of its fleshy consistency. It was only in 1889 when Oskar Minkowski discovered that removing the pancreas from a dog caused it to become diabetic. Insulin was later isolated from pancreatic islets by Frederick Banting and Charles Best in 1921.

The way the pancreatic tissue has been viewed has also changed. Previously, it was viewed using simple staining methods such as H&E stains. Now, immunohistochemistry can be used to differentiate cell types more easily. This involves visible antibodies to the products of certain cell types, and helps identify with greater ease cell types such as alpha and beta cells.

== Other animals ==
Pancreatic tissue is present in all vertebrates, but its precise form and arrangement vary widely. There may be up to three separate pancreases, two of which arise from the pancreatic bud, and the other dorsally. In most species (including humans), these "fuse" in the adult, but there are several exceptions. Even when a single pancreas is present, two or three pancreatic ducts may persist, each draining separately into the duodenum (or equivalent part of the foregut). Birds, for example, typically have three such ducts.

In teleost fish, and a few other species (such as rabbits), there is no discrete pancreas at all, with pancreatic tissue being distributed diffusely across the mesentery and even within other nearby organs, such as the liver or spleen. In a few teleost species, the endocrine tissue has fused to form a distinct gland within the abdominal cavity. Otherwise, it is distributed among the exocrine components. The most primitive arrangement, however, appears to be that of lampreys and lungfish, in which pancreatic tissue is found as many discrete nodules within the wall of the gut itself, with the exocrine portions being little different from other glandular structures of the intestine.

== Cuisine ==
The pancreas of calf (ris de veau), lamb (ris d'agneau), and less commonly of beef and pork, is used as food under the culinary name of sweetbread.

== Additional images ==
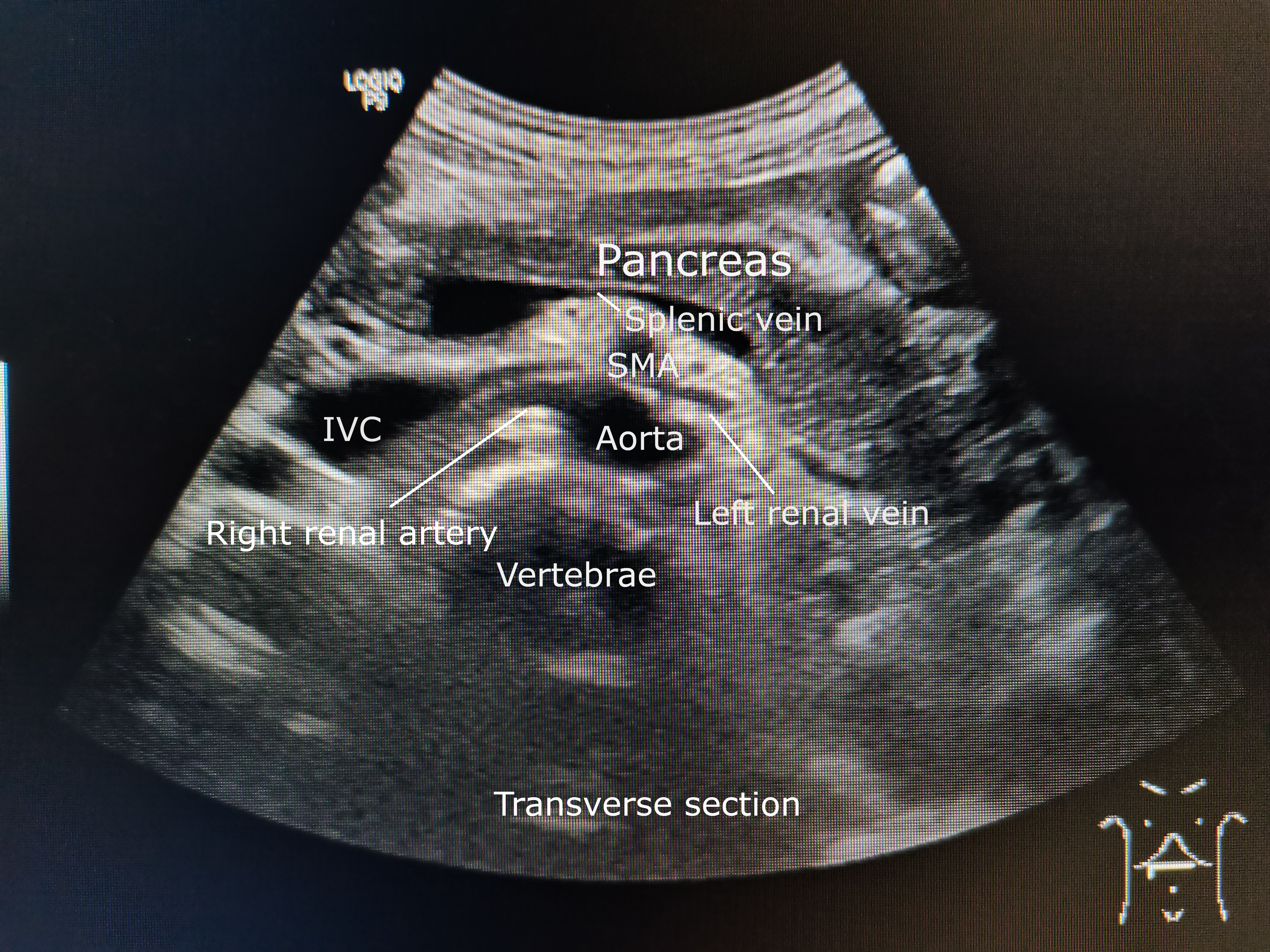
A normal pancreas on ultrasound.

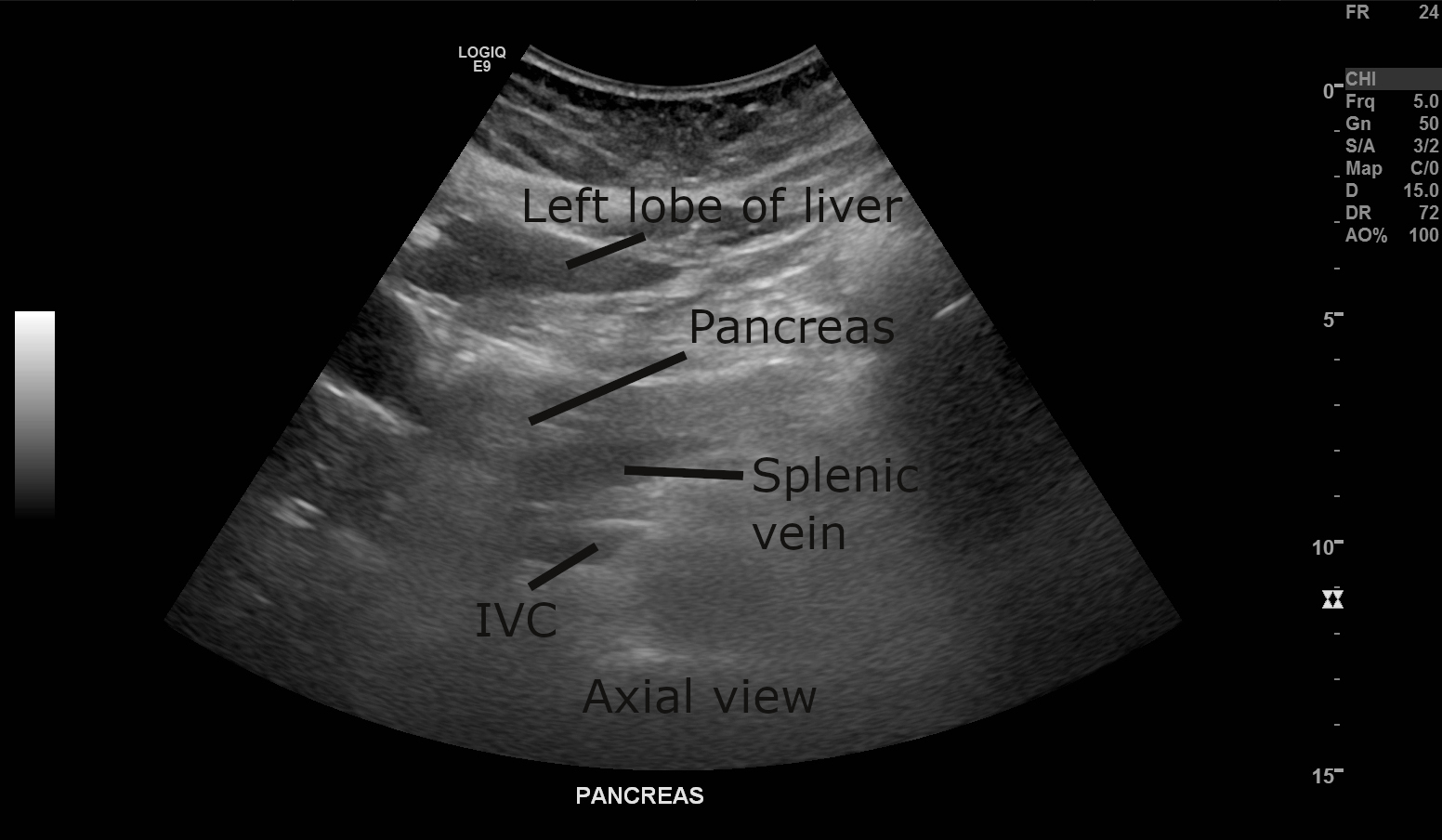
Identifying pancreas on abdominal ultrasonography when it is partly obscured by bowel gas.

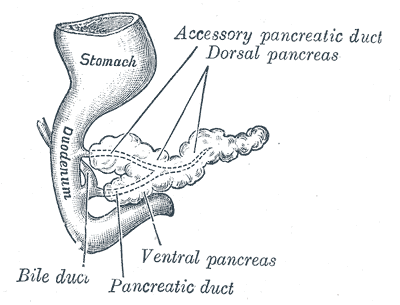
Pancreas of a human embryo at the end of the sixth week

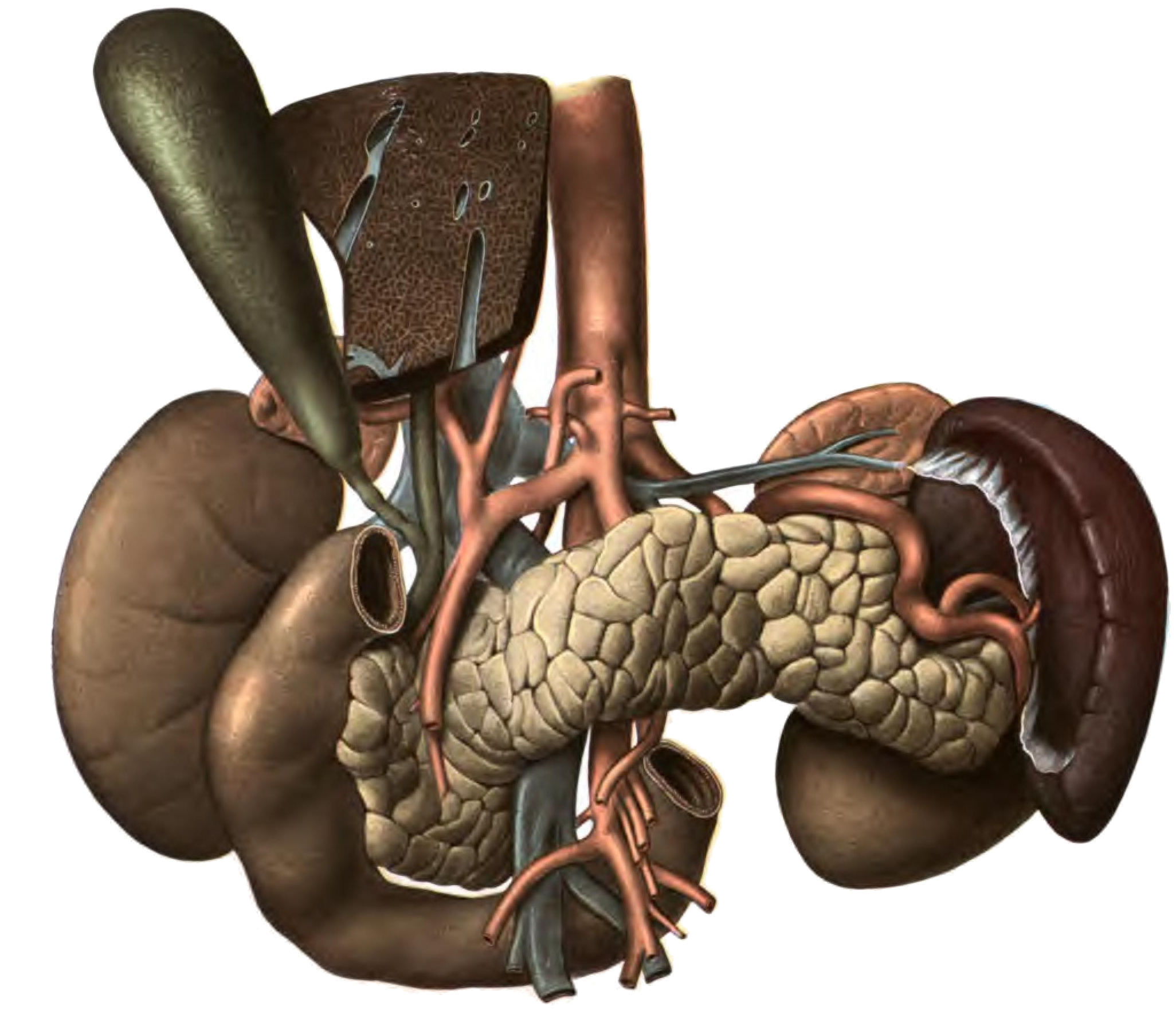
The pancreas and its surrounding structures

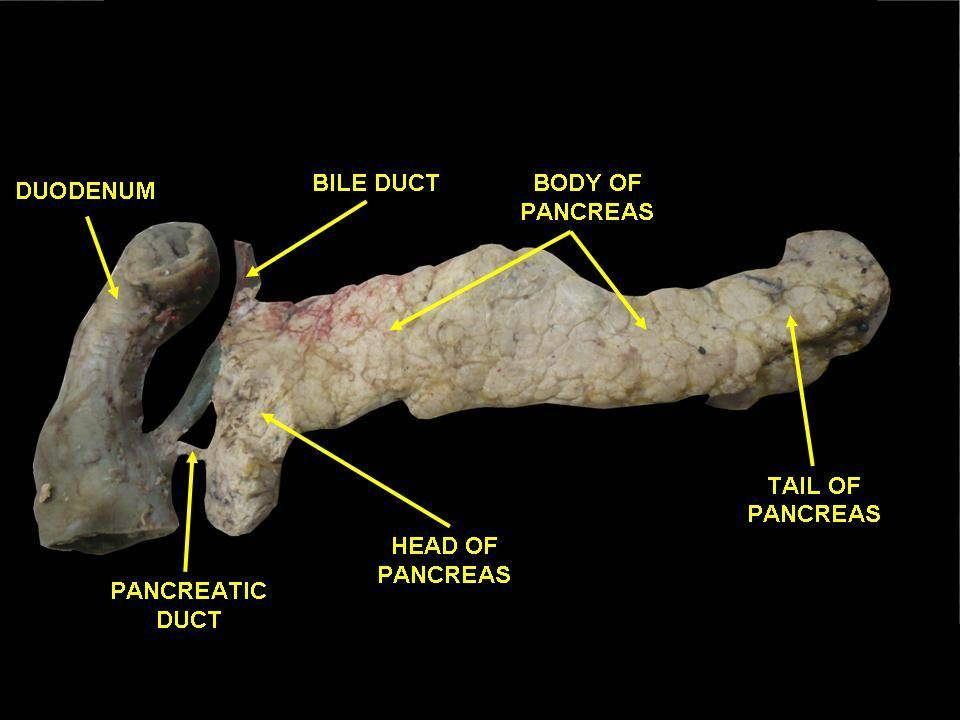
Duodenum and pancreas. Deep dissection.
