= Pancreatic duct =

Duct associated with the human pancreas

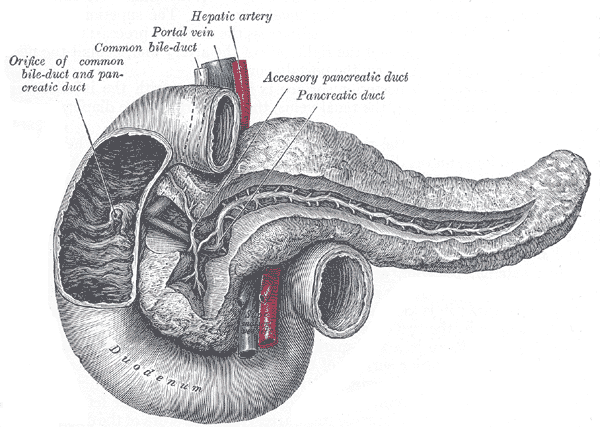
- The pancreatic duct

Details
- Precursor: Pancreatic bud

Identifiers
- Latin: ductus pancreaticus
- MeSH: D010183
- TA98: A05.9.01.015
- TA2: 3129
- FMA: 10419

1. Bile ducts: 2. Intrahepatic bile ducts; 3. Left and right hepatic ducts; 4. Common hepatic duct; 5. Cystic duct; 6. Common bile duct; 7. Ampulla of Vater; 8. Major duodenal papilla; 9. Gallbladder; 10–11. Right and left lobes of liver: 12. Spleen; 13. Esophagus; 14. Stomach; 15. Pancreas: 16. Accessory pancreatic duct; 17. Pancreatic duct; 18. Small intestine: 19. Duodenum; 20. Jejunum; 21–22. Right and left kidneys The front border of the liver has been lifted up (brown arrow).

The pancreatic duct or duct of Wirsung (also, the major pancreatic duct due to the existence of an accessory pancreatic duct) is a duct joining the pancreas to the common bile duct. This supplies it with pancreatic juice from the exocrine pancreas, which aids in digestion.

== Structure ==
The pancreatic duct joins the common bile duct just prior to the ampulla of Vater, after which both ducts perforate the medial side of the second portion of the duodenum at the major duodenal papilla. There are many anatomical variants reported, but these are quite rare.

=== Accessory pancreatic duct ===
Most people have just one pancreatic duct. However, some have an additional accessory pancreatic duct, also called the Duct of Santorini. An accessory pancreatic duct can be functional or non-functional. It may open separately into the second part of the duodenum, which is dorsal, and usually (in 70% of people) drains into the duodenum via the minor duodenal papilla. In the other 30% of people, it drains into the main pancreatic duct, which drains into the duodenum via the major duodenal papilla. The main pancreatic duct and the accessory duct both eventually—either directly or indirectly—connect to the second part ('D2', the vertical segment) of the duodenum.

It is named for Giovanni Domenico Santorini.

Formation of an accessory pancreatic duct

== Clinical significance ==
Compression, obstruction or inflammation of the pancreatic duct may lead to acute pancreatitis. The most common cause for obstruction is the presence of gallstones in the common bile duct, a condition called choledocholithiasis. Obstruction can also be due to duodenal inflammation in Crohn's disease. A gallstone may get lodged in the constricted distal end of the ampulla of Vater, where it blocks the flow of both bile and pancreatic juice into the duodenum. Bile backing up into the pancreatic duct may initiate pancreatitis. The pancreatic duct is generally regarded as abnormally enlarged if being over 3 mm in the head and 2 mm in the body or tail on CT scan. Pancreatic duct or parts of pancreatic duct can be demonstrated on ultrasound in 75 to 85% of people.

=== Pancreatic ductal carcinoma ===
Pancreatic ductal adenocarcinoma is the most common form of pancreatic cancer. Bile acids are closely implicated in the growth and progression of pancreatic cancer. Bile acids appear to accelerate the carcinogenic processes in pancreatic ductal adenocarcinoma cells through the over expression of the MUC4 protein. A comparison of the composition of bile acids in bile (extracted from the common bile duct) of patients with adenocarcinoma of the pancreas and benign disease was performed. The concentration of the unconjugated bile acid cholic acid in the malignant group was significantly higher than in the benign group. Most of the risk factors of pancreatic cancer, including alcohol intake, smoking and a high fat diet, lead to high secretion of bile acids. Bile acid reflux into the pancreatic duct affects the epithelial cells or acinar cells from which pancreatic adenocarcinoma is derived.

== History ==
The pancreatic duct is also called the duct of Wirsung. This is named after its discoverer, the German anatomist Johann Georg Wirsung (1589–1643).

== Additional images ==
ERCP image showing the pancreatic duct and biliary tree.

Accessory digestive system.

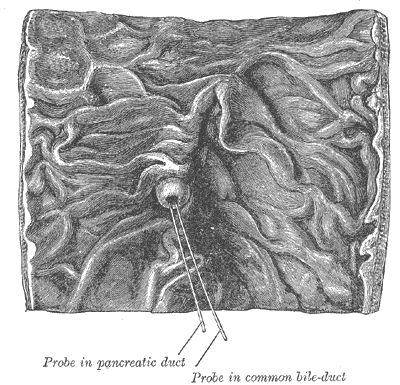
Interior of the descending portion of the duodenum, showing bile papilla.

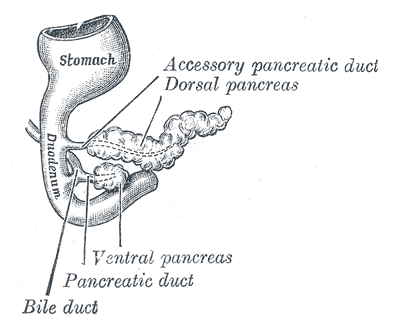
Pancreas of a human embryo of five weeks.

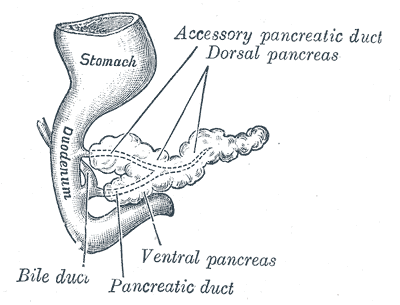
Pancreas of a human embryo at end of sixth week.

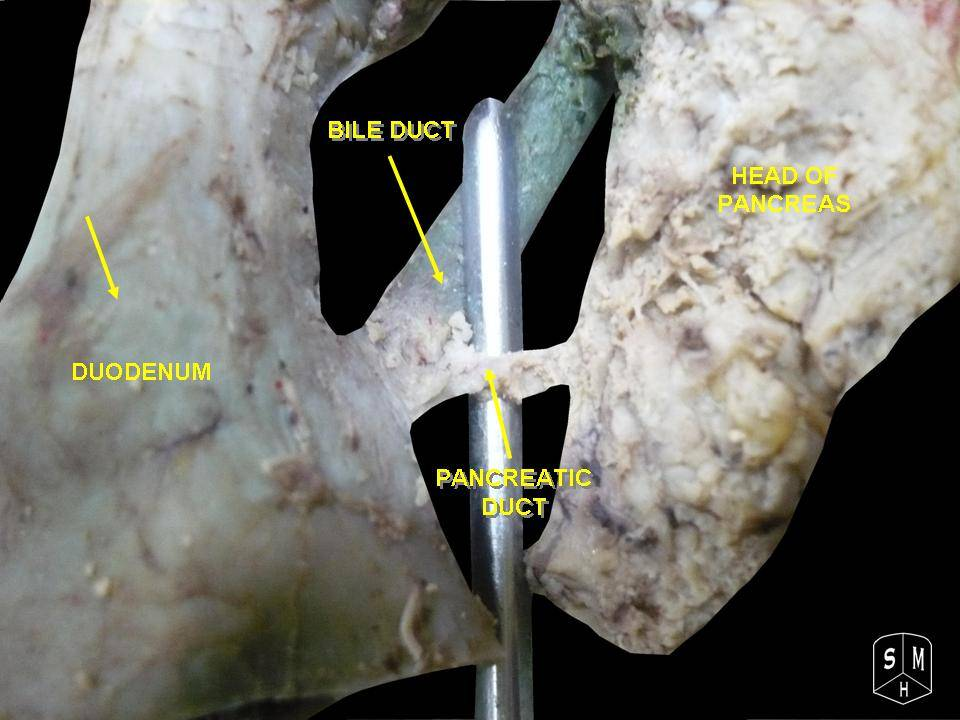
Pancreatic duct Deep dissection.Anterior view.

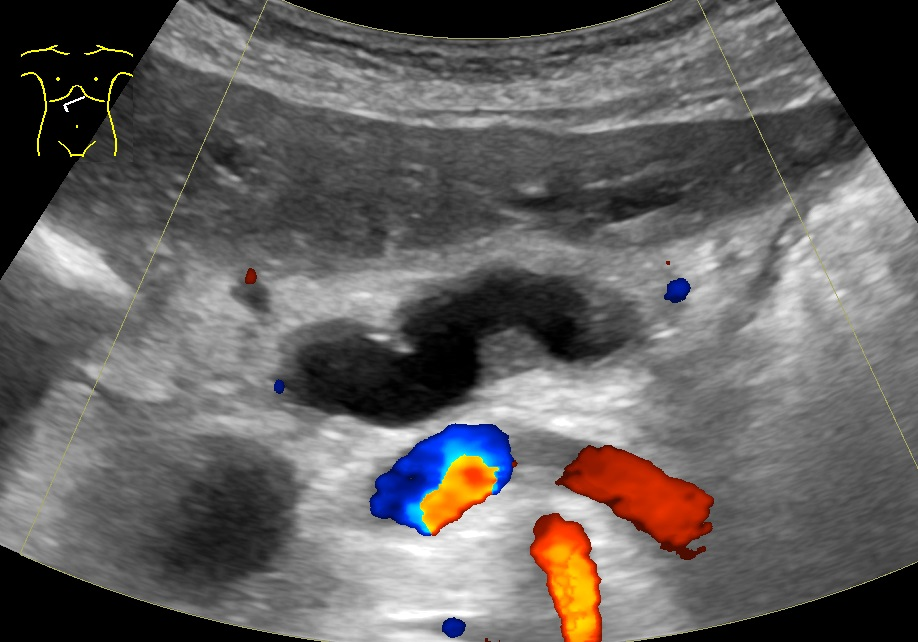
Ultrasonography of a dilated pancreatic duct (in this case 9mm) due to pancreatic cancer.

Accessory pancreatic duct

== See also ==
- Dorsal pancreatic agenesis
