= Biloma =

Circumscribed abdominal collection of bile outside the biliary tree

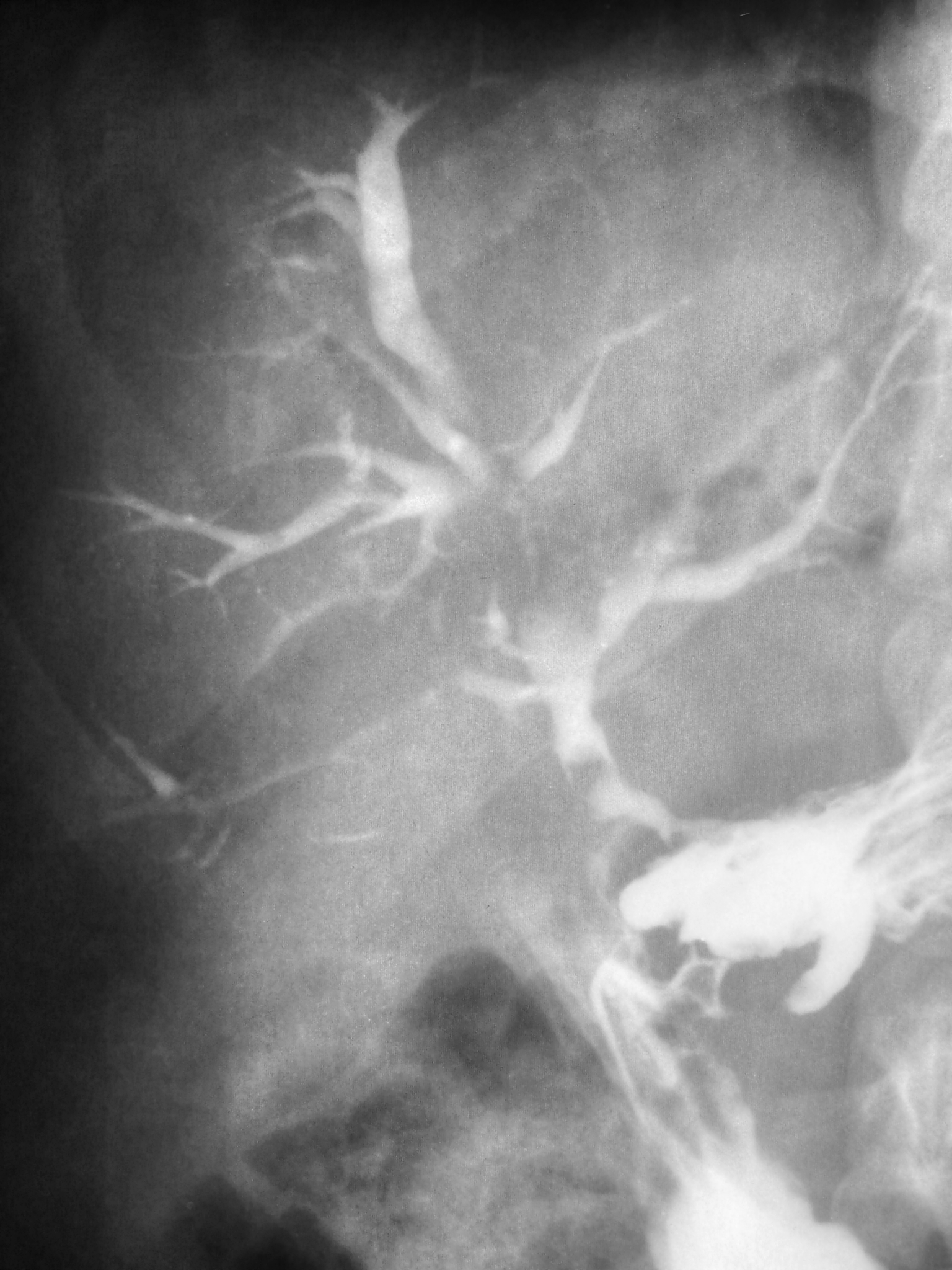
Duodenobiliary fistula of biliary tree.

A biloma is a circumscribed abdominal collection of bile outside the biliary tree. It occurs when there is excess bile in the abdominal cavity during or after a bile leak. There is an increased chance of a person developing biloma after having a gallbladder removal surgery, known as laparoscopic cholecystectomy. This procedure can be complicated by biloma with incidence of 0.3–2%. Other causes are liver biopsy, abdominal trauma, and, rarely, spontaneous perforation. The formation of biloma does not occur frequently. Biliary fistulas are also caused by injury to the bile duct and can result in the formation of bile leaks. Biliary fistulas are abnormal communications between organs and the biliary tract. Once diagnosed, they usually require drainage.

The term "biloma" was first coined in 1979 by Gould and Patel. They discovered it in a case with extrahepatic bile leakage. The cause of this was trauma to the upper right quadrant of the abdomen. Originally, biloma was described as an "encapsulated collection" of extrahepatic bile. Biloma is now described as extrabiliary collections of bile that can be either intrahepatic or extrahepatic. The most common cause of biloma is trauma to the liver. There are other causes such as abdominal surgery, endoscopic surgery and percutaneous catheter drainage. Injury and abdominal trauma can cause damage to the biliary tree. The biliary tree is a system of vessels that direct secreations from the liver, gallbladder, and pancreas through a series of ducts into the duodenum. This can result in a bile leak which is a common cause of the formation of biloma. It is possible for biloma to be associated with mortality, though it is not common. Bile leaks occur in about one percent of causes.

== Signs and symptoms ==
Symptoms include diffused or localized abdominal pain without a fever. A blood test will show leukocytosis and nonspecific liver test abnormalities. Symptoms of Biloma can range from severe to having no symptoms at all. If a patient presents with no symptoms, this event makes them nonspecific. Other symptoms can range from abdominal pain, distention, jaundice, and fever. Fevers are usually due to leukocytosis being present. Physical examination revealed epigastric fullness and right upper quadrant discomfort. This is usually the result of a disruption of the bile tree. In a case of infected biloma, the symptoms would include nausea, vomiting, and fever.

Patients may present with acute symptoms, no symptoms or a wide range of symptoms. This makes diagnosing biloma challenging. Early signs of biloma after traumatic injury include persistent abdominal distention, bloating, and/or anorexia. Patients who have undergone hepatobiliary surgery or laparoscopic cholecystectomy are more at risk for developing biloma. Consequently, these patients should be observed more frequently so it does not turn into an infection.

== Etiology ==
Research and diagnosis have proven that bilomas are secondary to biliary obstruction. This process is caused by trauma or iatrogenic procedures. Iatrogenic cases are procedures such as laparoscopic cholecystectomy, endoscopic retrograde cholangiopancreatography (ERCP), radiofrequency ablation (RFA), liver transplant, resection, and biopsy."

== Pathophysiology ==
Leakage of bile and destruction of the biliary tree are the most common causes of biloma. Destruction of the billary tree means that there is a blockage in the pancreatic or bile duct. Bile ducts are vessels that carry from the liver to the gallbladder. When bile becomes blocked, pancreatic juices cannot be transported to the intestines. Bile leakage causes inflammation in abdominal tissues or liver parenchyma. This results in fibrosis and encapsulation. Bile leakage is located at the biliary tube site with rare occurrences at the anastomotic site. Greenish-yellow bile is usually present as well as blood. This will occur if there is an infection present. Infections can lead to sepsis, abscess formation and inflammatory response.

== Diagnosis ==
Diagnosis includes abdominal ultrasounds. A wide range of symptoms makes the diagnosis of biloma difficult. Delayed diagnosis 77% of patients resulted from abdominal bile collections and bile leaks after a laparoscopic cholecystectomy. Radiographic imaging is used to diagnose and confirm bile leaks. Imaging also determines if it is extrahepatic or intrahepatic. A radiographic image will also show to what extent the bile leak is. A computerized tomography (CT) is also used to diagnose biloma. CT scans will show fluid collection in the right upper quadrant of the abdomen.In order to localize the leak, CT intravenous cholangiography can be used to show the communication between the biliary tree and the biloma. Magnetic resonance imaging (MRI) will demonstrate signaling intensity on T1-weighted imaging, and signaling intensity on T2-weighted imaging. This means that there is a fluid build up.

== Treatment ==
Severity of the condition will determine treatment options. Depending on the severity of the case of biloma, they will be treated differently. Laboratory and radiological findings of biloma will help in determining the overall treatment plan. There are several treatments for biloma. Treatments are symptom dependent and include endoscopic drainage, surgical drainage, or close monitoring. In asymptomatic situations, fluid collections can be reabsorbed and can be closely monitored without intervention.

Considering that biloma is a rare complication, most studies on successful treatment are derived from case reports. 150 cases of biloma have been reported and treated. Radiologically guided percutaneous drainage is also a successful treatment option. However, in the result of a failed drainage of biloma, surgery would be the next option. Due to draining being the best and preferred method of treatment, patients usually have a very good prognosis.

== Prognosis ==
There are several factors that will affect the prognosis of biloma. This includes: size, site and the etiology which can be described as the cause. Although prognosis still depends on size, site and etiology, patients usually recover. Cases of asymptomatic bilomas respond well to treatment. This means that there were no complications and the bile leak was successfully managed. In cases of symptomatic patients, those who had interventional radiology drainage have a successful prognosis. Drainage via interventional radiology prevents infection and improves patient morbidity and mortality.

Due to most bilomas being treated with percutaneous drainage, biloma will not recur or present with infection resulting in a good prognosis. There are instances in larger bile leaks where leaks into the peritoneum result in morbidity.

== Epidemiology ==
Due to the limited research and cases presented of biloma, there is little known of its epidemiology. Cases usually present in patients of 60 to 70 years of age. In majority of diagnosed cases, they are secondary to iatrogenic disruption of the biliary tree. This means the incidence of biloma will depend on the frequency of intervention. To date, there has not been a difference between men and women who have a formation of biloma. In the case of spontaneous biloma, they rarely form. All studies on spontaneous cases of biloma cases are from case reports dating 2007, which stated that 27 cases of spontaneous bilomas had been reported since 1979.

== Research directions ==
There was a study conducted from 2007 to 2017. The purpose of the study was to determine which method of treatment is most successful given a case of biloma. First the study determined that most biliary leaks resulted from cholecystectomy (27%) and hepatectomy (50%). In the study, endoscopic pseudocyst drainage was performed, which is a technique used to drain fluid. There was a clinical success rate of 70.4% in the group of patients.

The study concluded that the most successful treatment option is endoscopic pseudocyst drainage. The study states that using this technique will eliminate the need for surgery even in patients with complex cases.

== See also ==
- Biliary injury
