= Kurt Semm =

German gynecologist (1927–2003)

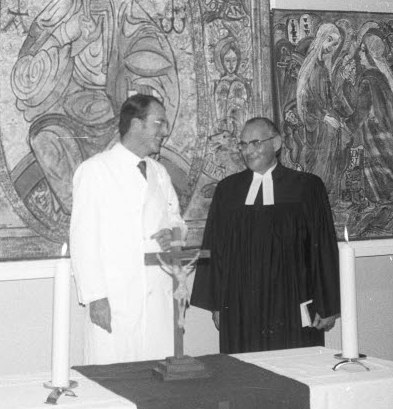
- Tryptichon in der Frauenklinik der Universitätsklinik (cropped)
- Born: 23 March 1927; Munich, Germany
- Died: 16 July 2003 (aged 76); Tucson, Arizona, U.S.
- Education: Ludwig-Maximilians-Universität München (M.D., 1951)
- Occupation: Gynecologist

Kurt Karl Stephan Semm (23 March 1927 – 16 July 2003) was a German gynecologist and pioneer in minimally invasive surgery. He has been called "the father of modern laparoscopy".

== Early life and education ==
Semm was born to Margarete and Karl Semm in Munich where he attended the Realgymnasium. At the end of World War II he was drafted for the Wehrmacht at the age of 16 and became briefly a Soviet prisoner of war. Upon his return he worked as a toolmaker.

In 1946, he was able to begin his medical studies at the Ludwig-Maximilians-Universität München. He received his MD degree in 1951 and worked at the II. Universitäts-Frauenklinik München. After his habilitation in 1958 he worked at the Frauenklinik Lindenstrasse. In 1964, the university named him Professor and he returned to the II. Universitäts-Frauenklinik. In 1970 Semm was named Director of the Gynecologic Services of the University of Kiel. Semm retired in 1995 and moved to Tucson, Arizona. He died from complications of Parkinson's disease.

Semm was married twice. His first wife, Roswitha, died in 1986 from breast cancer. In 1994 he married Iseult O'Neill. They have two children.

== Work ==
Richard Fikentscher got Semm interested in the treatment of infertility. In 1957, Fikentscher, Semm and three other physicians founded of the Deutsche Gesellschaft zum Studium der Fertilität und Sterilität, renamed Deutsche Gesellschaft für Reproduktionsmedizin in 1998. In the 1960s Semm started to use laparoscopy – he named it pelviscopy - for gynecologic indications, initially as a diagnostic tool, but soon realizing that the laparoscopic approach had potential for interventive surgery. His experience as toolmaker let him to found the WISAP medical instrument company in 1959 allowing him to developed numerous instruments among them an automated electronic CO_{2} insufflator, uterine manipulators, thermocoagulators to stop bleeding, and extra- and intracorporeal endoscopic knotting devices to tie off vessels or remove organs.

When Semm introduced laparoscopic surgery at the University of Kiel, he had to undergo a brain scan at the request of coworkers as "only a person with brain damage would perform such laparoscopic surgery". During the 1970s Semm pioneered numerous gynecologic laparoscopic operations so that the end of the decade he had performed myomectomies, ovariectomies, ovarian cysts resections, removals of tubal pregnancy, and others.

On 13 September 1980 Semm performed the first laparoscopic appendectomy opening up the path for a much wider application of minimally invasive surgery. At first, his operation was severely criticized. Initial attempts to publish it were rejected, and the American Journal of Obstetrics and Gynecology indicated that his technique was "unethical". The president of the German Surgical Society demanded that Semm should be suspended from medical practice. But Semm was tireless in advocating his techniques and gradually got some surgeons interested. In 1985 Erich Mühe showed that Semm's laparoscopic approach could be applied for cholecystectomy, and it became the gold standard within a decade and remains so. With the acceptance by general surgery, minimally invasive surgery expanded its applications.

Semm produced over 700 publications and spoke at over 1,300 national or international meetings and conventions. He made over 1,000 improvements to instruments.

== Awards ==
- President of the International Federation of Fertility Societies (1986–89)
- Member of Deutsche Akademie der Naturforscher Leopoldina (1986)
- Bundesverdienstkreuz (1987)
- Bayerischer Verdienstorden (1991)
- Excel Award for Outstanding Contributions To Laparoscopic, Robotic and Minimally Invasive Surgery. SLS The Society of Laparoscopic and Robotic Surgeons (1992)
- Fellow of the Royal College of Obstetricians and Gynaecologists
- Fellow of the International College of Surgeons ad honorem (1992)
- Bundesverdienstkreuz (1995)
- Honorary member Deutsche Gesellschaft für Gynäkologie und Geburtshilfe (1996)
- Pioneer in Endoscopy Award (Society of American Gastrointestinal Endoscopic Surgeons) (2002)
- Honorary membership of the International Society of Gynecological Endoscopy (2003)
- Kurt-Semm-Award, for video contributions in hysteroscopy and laparoscopic surgery by the Deutsche Gesellschaft für Gynäkologie und Geburtshilfe

== Selected publications ==
- Semm K: Pelviskopie und Hysteroskopie – Farbatlas u. Lehrbuch. Schattauer Verlag, Stuttgart 1976, ISBN 3-7945-0442-9
- Semm K: Atlas of gynecologic laparoscopy and hysteroscopy. Saunders, Philadelphia 1977, ISBN 0-7216-8063-1
- Semm K: Diapositiv-Atlas der Pelviskopie, Hysteroskopie und Fetoskopie. (1979)
- Semm K (1983). "Endoscopic appendectomy". Endoscopy. 15 (2): 59–64. doi:10.1055/s-2007-1021466. PMID 6221925. S2CID 45763958.
- Semm K: Operationslehre für endoskopische Abdominal-Chirurgie: operative Pelviskopie, operative Laparoskopie Schattauer Verlag, Stuttgart 1984, ISBN 3-7945-0391-0
- Semm K: Pelviscopy - operative guidelines for "minimally invasive surgery" following an organ oriented classification. WISAP, Sauerlach b. München 1992, ISBN 3-922500-46-3
- Semm K: Pelviskopie, ein operativer Leitfaden nach einer organ-orientierten Klassifizierung für „minimal invasive Chirurgie. WISAP, Sauerlach b. München 1991, ISBN 3-922500-41-2
- Semm K (1992). "Totale Uterus Mucosa Ablatio (TUMA) - C*U*R*T* anstelle Endometrium-Ablation". Geburtsh Frauenheilk. 52 (12): 773–7. doi:10.1055/s-2007-1023810. PMID 1490557. S2CID 72564386.
- Semm K (1991). "Technical surgical steps of endoscopic appendectomy". Langenbecks Arch Chir. 376 (2): 121–6. doi:10.1007/BF01263469. PMID 1829131.
- Semm K (1996). "Endoscopic subtotal hysterectomy without colpotomy: classic intrafascial SEMM hysterectomy. A new method of hysterectomy by pelviscopy, laparotomy, per vaginam or functionally by total uterine mucosal ablation". Int Surg. 81 (4): 362–70. PMID 9127796.
- Mettler L, Semm K (1997). "Subtotal versus total laparoscopic hysterectomy". Acta Obstet Gynecol Scand Suppl. 164: 88–93. PMID 9225648.
- Semm K, Semm I (1999). "Maintenance of Body Temperature at Laparoscopic Surgery". Surg Technol Int VIII. 8: 39–43. PMID 12451507.
- Turner D, Semm K (2000). "The Role of Computers and Robotics in Endoscopic Surgery". Surg Technol Int VIII. VIII: 23–27. PMID 12451505.
- Semm K Operationen ohne Skalpell: ein Gynäkologe als Wegbereiter der Minimal Invasiven Medizin (Autobiografie), ecomed Verlag, Landsberg 2002, ISBN 3-609-20152-5
- Mettler L, Semm K: Endoskopische Abdominalchirurgie in der Gynäkologie. Schattauer Verlag, Stuttgart 2002, ISBN 3-7945-1965-5
