= Waltman Walter syndrome =

Waltman Walter syndrome is characterized by accumulation of bile in the right subphrenic or subhepatic space, even when provision for drainage appears to have been adequate after a cholecystectomy. It is named for Dr. Waltman Walters, an abdominal surgeon at the Mayo Clinic in Rochester, MN.

== Symptoms and signs ==
Upper abdominal or chest pain associated with tachycardia and persistently low blood pressure due to compression on IVC are cardinal signs and are mistaken for coronary thrombosis.

== Diagnosis ==
Ultrasonography will show collection in subphrenic or subhepatic space.

== Treatment ==
Abdominal reexploration and drainage of bile is curative.
