= Erich Mühe =

German surgeon (1938 - 2005)

- Born: May 23, 1938
- Died: November 20, 2005 (aged 67)
- Education: University of Erlangen-Nuremberg
- Medical career
- Profession: Surgeon

Erich Mühe (23 May 1938 – 20 November 2005) was a German surgeon known for performing the first laparoscopic cholecystectomy in 1985.

== Biography ==
Erich Mühe completed medical school in 1966 and finished his surgical training at the University of Erlangen in 1973. He moved to Böblingen in 1982 to take a position as the head of surgery in a local hospital.

=== Laparoscopic cholecystectomy ===
Inspired by Kurt Semm's pioneering use of laparoscopy, a minimally invasive surgical technique, Mühe designed his own surgical laparoscope, which he called the "Galloscope", in 1984. He first used it to remove a gallbladder (in a procedure known as cholecystectomy) on September 12, 1985, marking the world's first laparoscopic cholecystectomy. He first presented his work in April 1986 at the Congress of the German Society of Surgery, after performing 94 successful surgeries using his technique. He gave two further lectures on his technique in 1986 and 1987, but his surgical colleagues disapproved of the technique, regarding it as dangerous and describing it as "Mickey Mouse surgery".

In 1987, when one of Mühe's patients died from complications related to the surgery, Mühe faced charges of manslaughter. He was cleared of the charges in 1990, by which time laparoscopic cholecystectomy was being performed widely across North America; Mühe was only recognised years later as the first to perform the surgery. The achievement has also been credited to two French surgeons: Philippe Mouret, who first performed the surgery in 1987; and François Dubois, who did the same in 1988. In 1992, the German Society of Surgery—which had initially rejected Mühe's work—awarded him its top honour, the Anniversary Award. The following year, the president of the society's 1986 congress apologised to Mühe, describing his work as "without a doubt one of the greatest original achievements of German medicine in recent history". The Society of American Gastrointestinal and Endoscopic Surgeons formally recognised Mühe as the first surgeon to perform a laparoscopic cholecystectomy in 1999.
