= Phrygian cap (anatomy) =

Normal anatomical variant of the gallbladder

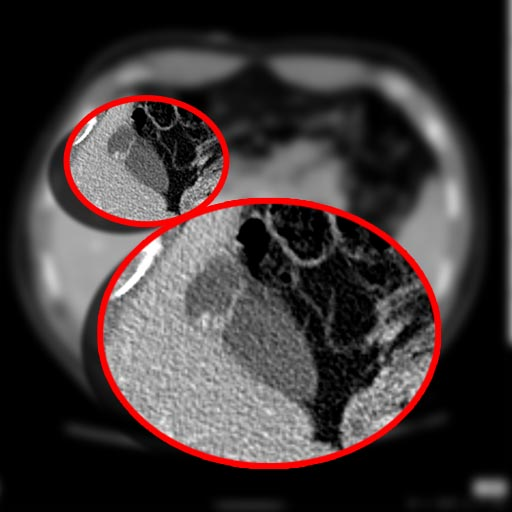
CT scan showing a Phrygian cap

In medicine, a Phrygian cap is the folded portion of some gallbladders that resembles the Phrygian cap (a soft conical cap with the top pulled forward, associated in antiquity with the inhabitants of Phrygia, a region of central Anatolia). It is a normal anatomical variant seen in 1-6% of patients. It is caused by a fold in the gallbladder where the gallbladder fundus joins the gallbladder body. Apart from the chance of being mistaken for stones on a sonogram, it has no other medical implications nor does it predispose one to other diseases.

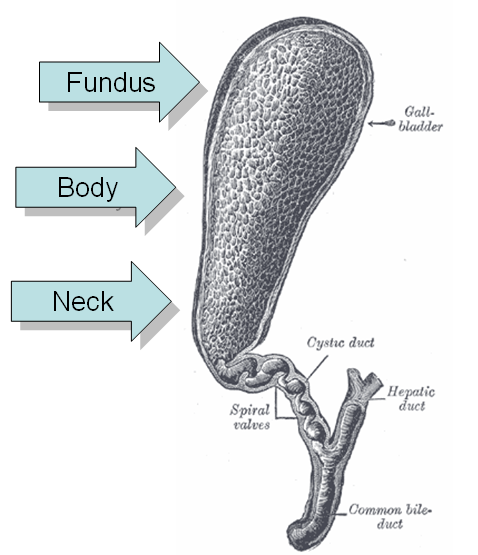
A healthy gallbladder. The Phrygian cap results from folding of the gallbladder fundus

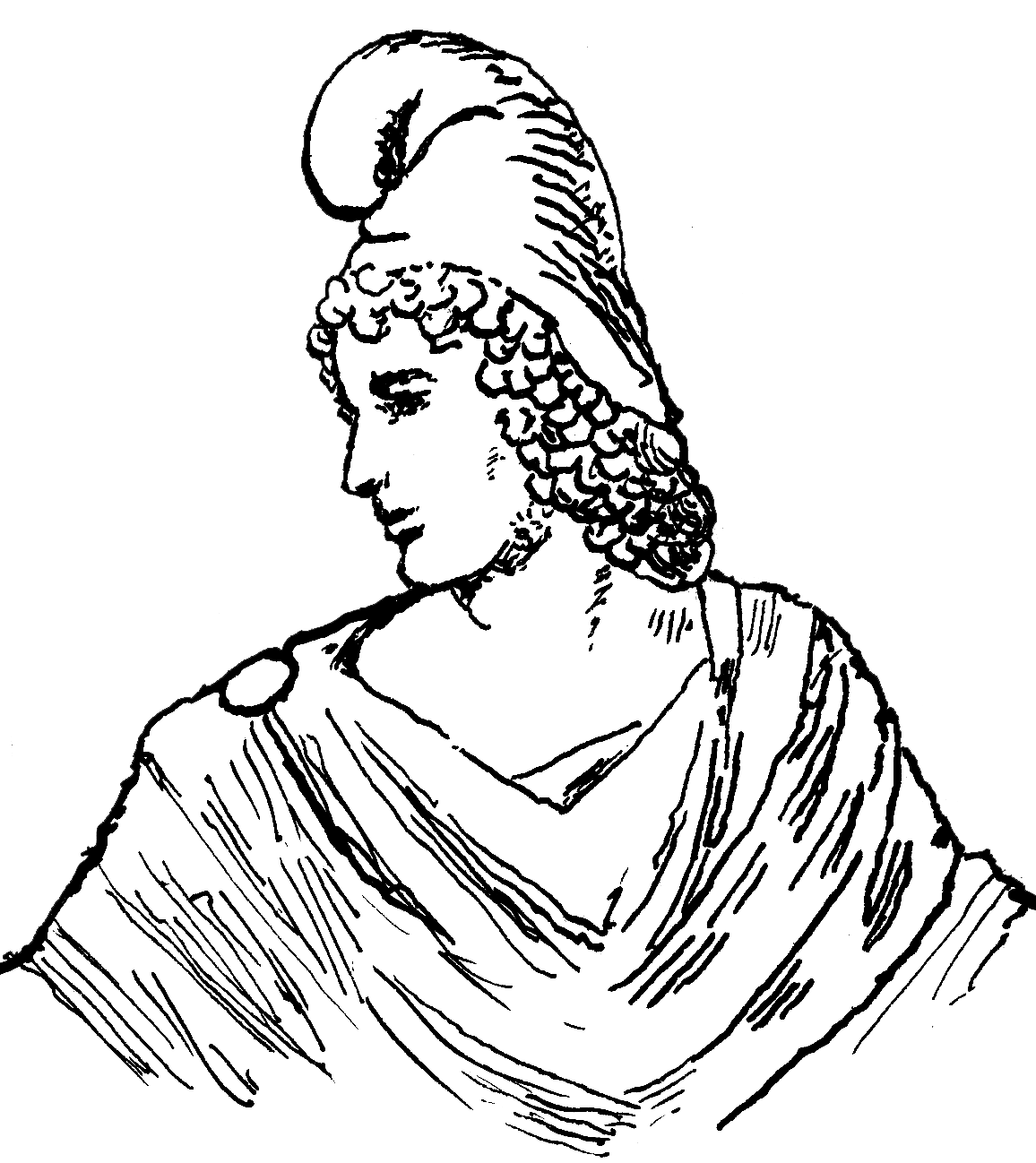
Illustration of a Phrygian cap as typically depicted in classical art
