= Liselotte Mettler =

Austrian-German surgeon

Liselotte Mettler is an Austrian-German surgeon who specializes in endocrinology, reproductive medicine, gynecological endoscopy and gynecological oncology. Mettler is a professor emeritus for the Department of Gynecology and Obstetrics at Kiel University, Germany where she worked closely with Kurt Semm. Mettler is the author of more than 600 publications and several books.

== Awards and honours ==
- In 2021, Liselotte Mettler was honored with the prestigious Order of Merit of Schleswig-Holstein (Verdienstorden des Landes Schleswig-Holstein) for her exceptional contributions to her field.

== Selected bibliography ==
- Mettler, Liselotte; Patvegar, M; et al., "Value of malignancy exclusion of ovarian cysts prior to laparoscopy", J Reproduktionsmed Endokrinol 5 (2008), Nr. 2, S. 93–100
- Mettler, Liselotte; Schollmeyer, Thoralf et al., "Robotic assistance in gynecological oncology.", Current Opinion in Oncology 20 (2008), Nr. 5, S. 581–9
- Soyinka, A S, Mettler, Liselotte, et al., "Enhancing Laparoscopic Performance with the LTS3E: A Computerized Hybrid Physical Reality Simulator", Fertil Steril 90 (2008), Nr. 5, S. 1988–94
- Summa, Birte, Mettler, Liselotte, et al., "Early detection of a twin tubal pregnancy by Doppler sonography allows fertility-conserving laparoscopic surgery.", Arch Gynecology Obstetrics May (2008), Nr. 1, S. 1
- Mettler, L. et al. The past, present and future of minimally invasive endoscopyin gynecology: A review and speculative outlook. Minimally Invasive Therapy: 2013;22:210-226
