= Carl Langenbuch =

German surgeon (1846–1901)

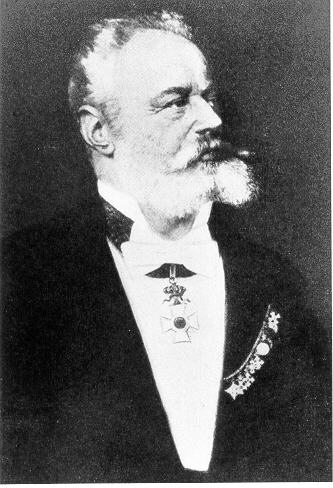
Carl Johann August Langenbuch (ca. 1900)

Carl Johann August Langenbuch (20 August 1846 – 9 June 1901) was a German surgeon.

He studied medicine at the University of Kiel, and later served as a military surgeon during the Franco-Prussian War. Beginning in 1871 he worked as an assistant to Robert Friedrich Wilms at the Bethanien Hospital in Berlin, and from 1873 to 1901 he was chief physician of the surgical department at Lazarus Hospital (Berlin). He died in 1901 from peritonitis caused by a ruptured appendix.

On 15 July 1882 he performed the first successful cholecystectomy when he surgically removed the gall bladder from a 43-year-old male patient.

== Selected works ==
- Ein Fall von Exstirpation der Gallenblase wegen chronischer Cholelithiasis. Heilung; In: Berliner klinische Wohenschrift. 48 (725–727), (1882) – A case of extirpation of the gallbladder for chronic cholelithiasis. Cure.
- Ueber die Principien des zeitgemassen Kriegswundverbandes, (1887).
- Die Sectio alta subpubica. Eine anatomisch-chirurgische Studie, (1888).
- Der Leberechinococcus und seine Chirurgie, (1890) – On echinococcus of the liver and surgery.
- Chirurgie der Leber und Gallenblase, (2 volumes, 1894–97) – Surgery of the liver and gall bladder.
- Ein Rückblick auf die Entwicklung der Chirurgie des Gallensystems, (1896) – Review on the development of surgery involving the gall bladder.
