= Gallbladder flush =

Practice in alternative medicine

The gallbladder flush or liver cleanse is an alternative medicine practice involving fasting, followed by the ingestion of some combination of Epsom salt, olive oil, and grapefruit juice, in some cases substituted by other, similar ingredients. Those who advocate it claim that it is possible to remove not only the well-known gallstones from the gallbladder, but also the so-called intra-hepatic stones from the bile ducts of the liver by this procedure.

There are different sets of rules, according to which a gallbladder flush is performed. One can distinguish between "recipes" originating in traditional folk medicine and those of which the author is known.

When scientifically analyzed, the "gallstones" produced by a group of patients were found to contain no cholesterol, bilirubin, or calcium, which characterizes the makeup of gallstones, but instead were 75% fatty acids. In two cases, chemical analysis of supposed gallstones that were excreted in the course of a gallbladder flush showed that these were not real gallstones, but "soap stones", which are structures formed in the gut due to a reaction of the digestive juices with the ingested treatment.

== Risks ==
People attempting this treatment often experience abdominal pain and diarrhea.

In one reported case, a patient suffered a biliary pancreatitis after performing a gallbladder flush.
