= Biliary injury =

Damage to bile ducts

Biliary injury (bile duct injury) is the traumatic damage of the bile ducts. It is most commonly an iatrogenic complication of cholecystectomy (surgical removal of the gallbladder), but can also be caused by other operations or by major trauma. The risk of biliary injury is higher during laparoscopic cholecystectomy than during open cholecystectomy. Biliary injury may lead to several complications and may even cause death if not diagnosed in time and managed properly. Ideally biliary injury should be managed at a center with facilities and expertise in endoscopy, radiology and surgery.

== Signs and symptoms ==
Only about 25 to 40% of bile duct injuries are detected intraoperatively. A biliary stricture, leak, or obstruction may be the injury's outward manifestation. A history of gallbladder empyema or gangrenous cholecystitis as reasons for cholecystectomy should raise the possibility of biliary injury. If the bile duct injury is not recognized right away, the patient may present with bile in the drain, if one was left in place. Otherwise, bile may drain from the incision. Postoperative symptoms of biliary injury include fever, vague pain in the abdomen, nausea, pruritis, and failure to tolerate diet.

== Causes ==
Biliary tract injuries caused by trauma are uncommon. Intrahepatic injuries occur in conjunction with hepatic injuries in blunt (crushing injuries, direct blows to the abdomen, falls from great heights, vehicular accidents) or penetrating (stabbing and gunshot wounds) abdominal trauma. The prevalence of bile leaks, or biliary injuries, in liver trauma is estimated to be between 4 and 23%.

Iatrogenic injuries are most commonly seen during laparoscopic cholecystectomy. After conventional open cholecystectomy, the rate of clinically significant bile leaks ranges between 0.1 and 0.3%. Whereas, biliary leakages have increased by up to 3% in the era of laparoscopic cholecystectomy. There are numerous factors that can cause those injuries, including the surgeon's, endoscopist's, or radiologist's inexperience, anatomical variations in the region, which are common, inflammation of the gallbladder and surrounding tissue, which is the most common factor causing error, and as a result injury to the bile duct.

== See also ==
- Biloma
