= Cholecystectomy =

Surgical removal of the gallbladder

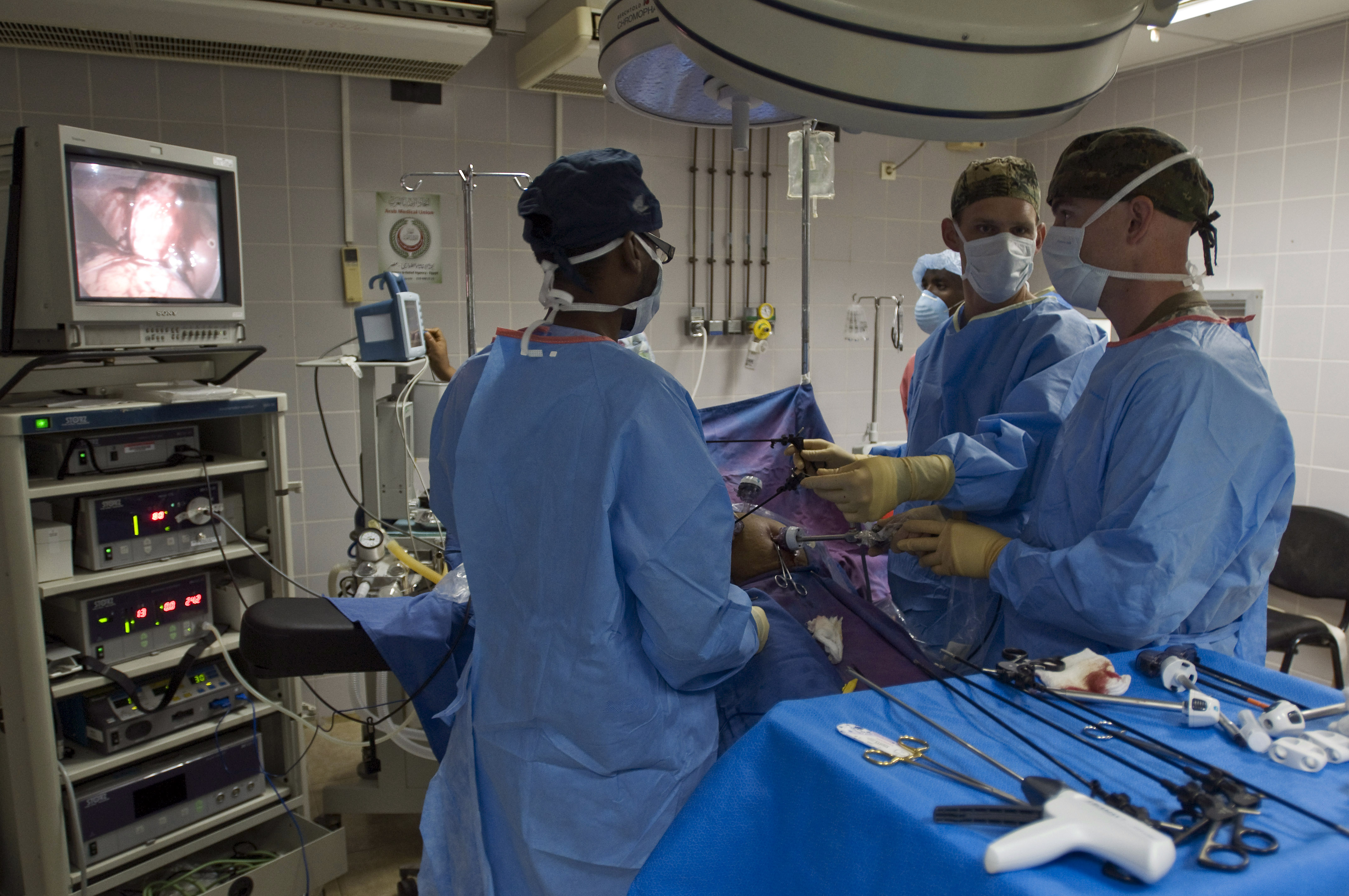
- A US Navy general surgeon and an operating room nurse performing a laparoscopic cholecystectomy
- Pronunciation: /ˌkɒləsɪsˈtɛktəmi/
- Specialty: General surgery
- ICD-9-CM: 575.0
- MeSH: D002763
- CPT: 47562

Cholecystectomy is the surgical removal of the gallbladder. It is a common treatment of symptomatic gallstones and other gallbladder conditions. In 2011, cholecystectomy was the eighth most common operating room procedure performed in hospitals in the United States. Cholecystectomy can be performed either laparoscopically or through a laparotomy.

The surgery is usually successful in relieving symptoms, but up to 10 percent of people may continue to experience similar symptoms after cholecystectomy, a condition called postcholecystectomy syndrome. Complications of cholecystectomy include bile duct injury, wound infection, bleeding, vasculobiliary injury, retained gallstones, liver abscess formation and stenosis (narrowing) of the bile duct.

== Medical use ==
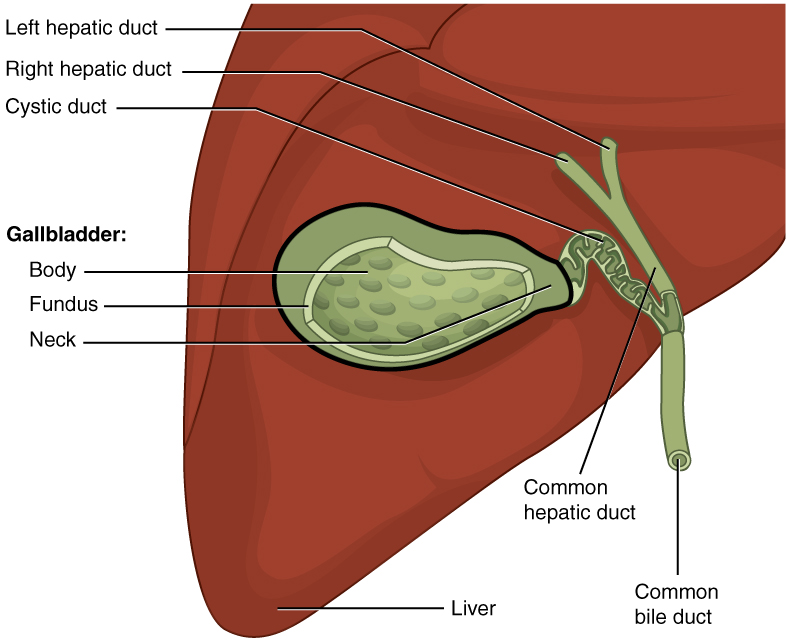
Gallbladder anatomy

Pain and complications caused by gallstones are the most common reasons for removal of the gallbladder. The gallbladder can also be removed in order to treat biliary dyskinesia or gallbladder cancer.

Gallstones are very common, but about 50–80% of people with gallstones are asymptomatic and do not need surgery; their stones are noticed incidentally on imaging tests of the abdomen (such as ultrasound or CT) done for some other reason. The traditional risk factors for gallstones are the four "F's: female, fat, forty, and fertile. Of the more than 20 million people in the US with gallstones, only about 30% will eventually require cholecystectomy to relieve symptoms or treat complications.

=== Biliary colic ===
Biliary colic, or pain caused by gallstones, occurs when a gallstone temporarily blocks the bile duct that drains the gallbladder. Typically, pain from biliary colic is felt in the right upper part of the abdomen, is moderate to severe, and goes away on its own after a few hours when the stone is either passed or dislodges. Biliary colic usually occurs after meals when the gallbladder contracts to push bile out into the digestive tract. After a first attack of biliary colic, more than 90% of people will have a repeat attack in the next 10 years. Repeated attacks of biliary colic are the most common reason for removing the gallbladder, and lead to about 300,000 cholecystectomies in the US each year.

=== Acute cholecystitis ===
Cholecystitis, or inflammation of the gallbladder caused by interruption in the normal flow of bile, is another reason for cholecystectomy. It is the most common complication of gallstones; 90–95% of acute cholecystitis is caused by gallstones blocking drainage of the gallbladder. If the blockage is incomplete and the stone passes quickly, the person experiences biliary colic. If the gallbladder is completely blocked and remains so for a prolonged period, the person develops acute cholecystitis.

Pain in cholecystitis is similar to that of biliary colic, but lasts longer than six hours and occurs together with signs of infection such as fever, chills, or an elevated white blood cell count. People with cholecystitis will also usually have a positive Murphy sign on physical exam – meaning that when a doctor asks the patient to take a deep breath and then pushes down on the upper right side of their abdomen, the patient winces with pain.

Five to ten percent of acute cholecystitis occurs in people without gallstones, and for this reason, is called acalculous cholecystitis. It usually develops in people who have abnormal bile drainage secondary to a serious illness, such as people with multi-organ failure, serious trauma, recent major surgery, or following a long stay in the intensive care unit.

People with repeat episodes of acute cholecystitis can develop chronic cholecystitis from changes in the normal anatomy of the gallbladder. This can also be an indication for cholecystectomy if the person has ongoing pain.

=== Cholangitis and gallstone pancreatitis ===
Cholangitis and gallstone pancreatitis are rarer and more serious complications from gallstone disease. Both can occur if gallstones leave the gallbladder, pass through the cystic duct, and get stuck in the common bile duct. The common bile duct drains the liver and pancreas, and a blockage there can lead to inflammation and infection in both the pancreas and biliary system. While cholecystectomy is not usually the immediate treatment choice for either of these conditions, it is often recommended to prevent repeat episodes from additional gallstones getting stuck.

=== Gallbladder cancer ===
Gallbladder cancer (also called carcinoma of the gallbladder) is a rare indication for cholecystectomy. In cases where cancer is suspected, the open technique for cholecystectomy is usually performed.

=== Liver transplantation ===
In living donor liver transplantation between adults, a cholecystectomy is performed in the donor because the gallbladder interferes with removal of the right lobe of the liver and to prevent the formation of gallstones in the recipient. The gallbladder is not removed in pediatric transplantations as the left lobe of the liver is used instead.

== Contraindications ==
There are no specific contraindications for cholecystectomy, and in general it is considered a low-risk surgery. However, anyone who cannot tolerate surgery under general anesthesia should not undergo cholecystectomy. People can be split into high and low risk groups using a tool such as the ASA physical status classification system. In this system, people who are ASA categories III, IV, and V are considered high risk for cholecystectomy. Typically this includes very elderly people and people with co-existing illness, such as end-stage liver disease with portal hypertension and whose blood does not clot properly. Alternatives to surgery are briefly mentioned below.

== Risks ==
All surgery carries risk of serious complications including damage to nearby structures, bleeding, infection, or even death. The operative death rate in cholecystectomy is about 0.1% in people under age 50 and about 0.5% in people over age 50. The greatest risk of death comes from co-existing illness like cardiac or pulmonary disease.

=== Biliary injury ===
A serious complication of cholecystectomy is biliary injury, or damage to the bile ducts. Laparoscopic cholecystectomy has a higher risk of bile duct injury than the open approach, with injury to bile ducts occurring in 0.3% to 0.5% of laparoscopic cases and 0.1% to 0.2% of open cases. In laparoscopic cholecystectomy, approximately 25–30% of biliary injuries are identified during the operation; the rest become apparent in the early post-operative period.

Damage to the bile ducts is very serious because it causes leakage of bile into the abdomen. Signs and symptoms of a bile leak include abdominal pain, tenderness, fever and signs of sepsis several days following surgery, or through laboratory studies as rising total bilirubin and alkaline phosphatase. Complications from a bile leak can follow a person for years and can lead to death. Bile leak should always be considered in any patient who is not recovering as expected after cholecystectomy. Most bile injuries require repair by a surgeon with special training in biliary reconstruction. If biliary injuries are properly treated and repaired, more than 90% of patients can have a long-term successful recovery.

Injury of the bile ducts can be prevented and treated by routinely using X-ray investigation of the bile ducts (intraoperative cholangiography (IOC)). This method was assessed by the Swedish SBU and routine use deemed to decrease risk of injury and morbidity following unaddressed injury while only increasing cancer rates due to radiation exposure by a lesser fraction.

=== Other complications ===
A review of safety data in laparoscopic cholecystectomy found the following complications to be most common:

Rates of complications other than bile duct injury after laparoscopic cholecystectomy
Complication	Prevalence
Wound infection	1.25%
Urinary retention	0.90%
Bleeding	0.79%
Retained stone in the common bile duct	0.50%
Respiratory	0.48%
Cardiac	0.36%
Intra-abdominal abscess	0.34%
Hernia	0.21%

The same study found the prevalence of bowel injury, sepsis, pancreatitis, and deep vein thrombosis/pulmonary embolism to be around 0.15% each.

Leakage from the stump of the cystic duct is a complication that is more common with the laparoscopic approach than the open approach but is still rare, occurring in less than 1% of procedures; it is treated by drainage followed by insertion of a bile duct stent.

Another complication singular to the laparoscopic procedure is the phenomenon of the "spilled gallstone" which complicates 0.08–0.3% of cases. Here a stone escapes the resected gallbladder into the abdomen where it can become a focus for infection if it is not identified and removed. Some reports exist of spilled stones lying unnoticed for up to 20 years before eventually causing an abscess to form.

=== Conversion to open cholecystectomy ===
Many biliary injuries in laparoscopic cases are caused by difficulties seeing and identifying the anatomy clearly. If the surgeon has problems identifying anatomical structures, they convert from laparoscopic to open cholecystectomy.

Peroperative Endoscopic Retrograde Cholangiopancreatography (ERCP)/ Laparoendoscopic rendezvous (LERV) technique

CBDS are found in 10–15% of patients during cholecystectomy when intraoperative cholangiography (IOC) is routinely performed. There are several strategies to manage choledocholithiasis but the optimal method as well as the timing of treatment is still under debate.

In recent years the LERV technique, in which access to the common bile duct by ERCP is facilitated by an antegrade guidewire, which is intraoperatively introduced during fluoroscopy and is advanced through the cystic duct to the duodenum, has been established as an alternative to treat common bile duct stones discovered during laparoscopic cholecystectomy. This technique was first described in 1993 by Deslandres et al. and has, in several studies, been shown to have a high rate of CBD stones clearance and a reduced number of complications, particularly post-ERCP pancreatitis, in comparison with conventional ERCP. This is probably due to the facilitated access to the common bile duct with a lesser degree of manipulation and trauma to the papilla Vateri. In a study by Swahn et al. the rendezvous method was shown to reduce the risk of PEP from 3.6 to 2.2% compared with conventional biliary cannulation. The success rate of passing the transcystic guidewire into the duodenum has been reported to be over 80%.

== Procedure ==
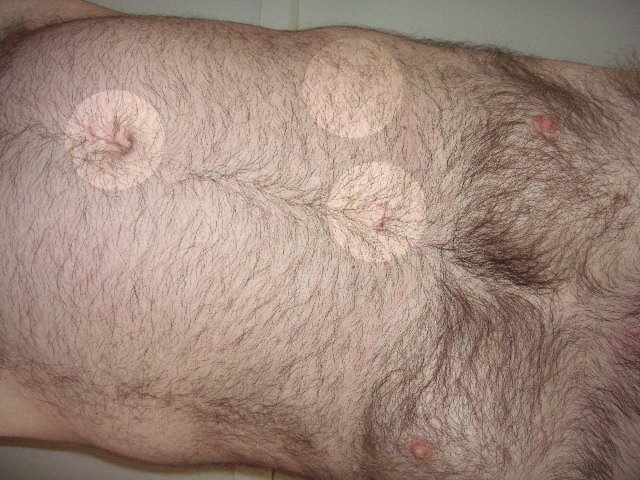
Abdomen of a 45-year-old male approximately one month after a laparoscopic cholecystectomy. Surgical incision points are highlighted. The gall bladder was removed via the incision at the navel. There is a fourth incision (not shown) on the person's right lower flank, used for draining.

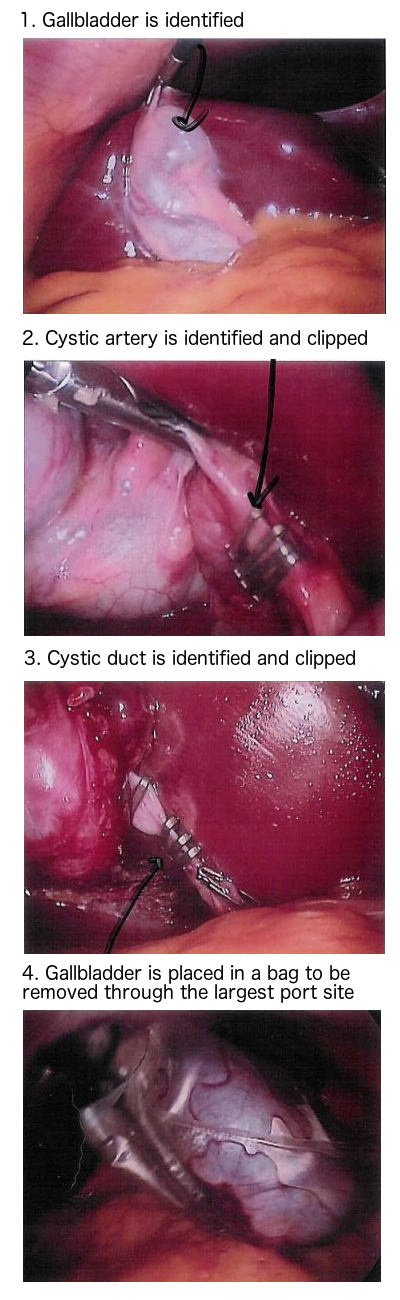
Steps of a cholecystectomy, as seen through a laparoscope

The 1-week-old incisions of a post-operative laparoscopic cholecystectomy as indicated by red arrows. The 3 abdominal incisions are approximately 6mm, while the fourth incision near the umbilicus is 18mm, each closed with dissolvable sutures.

=== Pre-operative preparation ===
Before surgery, a complete blood count and liver function tests are usually obtained. Prophylactic treatment is given to prevent deep vein thrombosis. Use of prophylactic antibiotics is controversial; however, a dose may be given prior to surgery to prevent infection in certain people at high risk. Gas may be removed from the stomach with an OG or NG tube. A Foley catheter may be used to empty the patient's bladder.

endoscopy camera view

=== Laparoscopic cholecystectomy ===
Laparoscopic cholecystectomy uses several (usually 4) small incisions in the abdomen to allow the insertion of operating ports, small cylindrical tubes approximately 5 to 10 mm in diameter, through which surgical instruments are placed into the abdominal cavity. The laparoscope, an instrument with a video camera and light source at the end, illuminates the abdominal cavity and sends a magnified image from inside the abdomen to a video screen, giving the surgeon a clear view of the organs and tissues. The cystic duct and cystic artery are identified and dissected, then ligated with clips and cut in order to remove the gallbladder. The gallbladder is then removed through one of the ports.

As of 2008, 90% of cholecystectomies in the United States were done laparoscopically. Laparoscopic surgery is thought to have fewer complications, shorter hospital stay, and quicker recovery than open cholecystectomy.

==== Single incision ====
Single incision laparoscopic surgery (SILS) or laparoendoscopic single site surgery (LESS) is a technique in which a single incision is made through the navel, instead of the 3-4 four small different incisions used in standard laparoscopy. There appears to be a cosmetic benefit over conventional four-hole laparoscopic cholecystectomy, and no advantage in postoperative pain and hospital stay compared with standard laparoscopic procedures. There is no scientific consensus regarding risk for bile duct injury with SILS versus traditional laparoscopic cholecystectomy.

==== Natural orifice transluminal ====
Natural orifice transluminal endoscopic surgery (NOTES) is an experimental technique where the laparoscope is inserted through natural orifices and internal incisions, rather than skin incisions, to access to the abdominal cavity. This offers the potential to eliminate visible scars. Since 2007, cholecystectomy by NOTES has been performed anecdotally via transgastric and transvaginal routes. As of 2009 the risk of gastrointestinal leak, difficulty visualizing the abdominal cavity and other technical limitations limited further adoption of NOTES for cholecystectomy.

=== Open cholecystectomy ===
In open cholecystectomy, a surgical incision of around 8 to 12 cm is made below the edge of the right rib cage and the gallbladder is removed through this large opening, typically using electrocautery. Open cholecystectomy is often done if difficulties arise during a laparoscopic cholecystectomy, for example, the patient has unusual anatomy, the surgeon cannot see well enough through the camera, or the patient is found to have cancer. It can also be done if the patient has severe cholecystitis, emphysematous gallbladder, fistulization of gallbladder and gallstone ileus, cholangitis, cirrhosis or portal hypertension, and blood dyscrasias.

=== Biopsy ===
After removal, the gallbladder should be sent for pathological examination to confirm the diagnosis and look for any incidental cancer. Incidental cancer of the gallbladder is found in approximately 1% of cholecystectomies. If cancer is present in the gallbladder, it is usually necessary to re-operate to remove parts of the liver and lymph nodes and test them for additional cancer.

=== Post-operative management ===
After surgery, most patients are admitted to the hospital for routine monitoring. For uncomplicated laparoscopic cholecystectomies, people may be discharged on the day of surgery after adequate control of pain and nausea. Patients who were high-risk, those who required emergency surgery, and/or those undergoing open cholecystectomy usually need to stay in the hospital several days after surgery.

=== Subtotal Cholecystectomy ===
Intra-operative decisions, with patient safety at the forefront, sometimes call for what is known in surgical education as "bail-out" procedures. This is usually due to the surgical team making a clinical decision in the operating room to not proceed with the intended cholecystectomy, due to issues such as adherent bowel or colon, or inability to properly identify anatomical planes from previously formed scar-tissue. If there is any inability to safely isolate the cystic duct and cystic artery structures needed for cholecystectomy – such as an aforementioned adherent bowel, the separation of which often results in an accidental hole thereto – the surgical team may elect to do a subtotal cholecystectomy, of either a fenestrated or reconstituting type. Essentially, only part of the gall bladder is removed and a drain is left in place for several days. Complications include continued output from the drain, which may result in the need for an ERCP stent placement to stop drainage.

== Long-term prognosis ==
In 95% of people undergoing cholecystectomy as treatment for simple biliary colic, removing the gallbladder completely resolves their symptoms.

Up to 10% of people who undergo cholecystectomy develop a condition called postcholecystectomy syndrome. Symptoms are typically similar to the pain and discomfort of biliary colic with persistent pain in the upper right abdomen and commonly include gastrointestinal distress (dyspepsia).

Some people following cholecystectomy may develop diarrhea. The cause is unclear but is presumed to be due to disturbances in the biliary system that speed up enterohepatic recycling of bile salts. The terminal ileum, the portion of the intestine where these salts are normally reabsorbed, becomes overwhelmed, does not absorb everything, and the person develops diarrhea. Most cases resolve within weeks or a few months, though in rare cases the condition can last for years. It can be controlled with medication such as cholestyramine.

A systematic review and meta-analysis of eighteen studies on the association between cholecystectomy and the risk of development of colorectal cancer concluded that cholecystecomy has no effect on the risk of colorectal cancer overall, but does have a harmful effect on the risk of right-sided colon cancer. A nationwide cohort study in Korea reported a significantly increased total cancer risk, including increased risk of several different specific types of cancer, after cholecystectomy.

== Considerations ==
=== Pregnancy ===
It is generally safe for pregnant women to undergo laparoscopic cholecystectomy during any trimester of pregnancy. Early elective surgery is recommended for women with symptomatic gallstones to decrease the risk of spontaneous abortion and pre-term delivery. Without cholecystectomy, more than half of such women will have recurrent symptoms during their pregnancy, and nearly one in four will develop a complication, such as acute cholecystitis, that requires urgent surgery. Acute cholecystitis is the second most common cause of acute abdomen in pregnant women after appendectomy.

=== Porcelain gallbladder ===
Porcelain gallbladder (PGB), a condition where the gallbladder wall shows calcification on imaging tests, was previously considered a reason to remove the gallbladder because it was thought that people with this condition had a high risk of developing gallbladder cancer. However, recent studies have shown that there is no strong association between gallbladder cancer and porcelain gallbladder and Incomplete calcification showed higher frequency of malignancy compared with complete calcification and that PGB alone is not a strong enough indication for a prophylactic cholecystectomy.

== Alternatives to surgery ==
There are several alternatives to cholecystectomy for people who do not want surgery, or in whom the benefits of surgery would not outweigh the risks.

=== Conservative management ===
Conservative management for biliary colic involves a "watch and wait" approach—treating symptoms as-needed with oral medications. Experts agree that this is the preferred treatment for people with gallstones but no symptoms. Conservative management may also be appropriate for people with mild biliary colic, as the pain from colic can be managed with pain medications like NSAIDs (ex: ketorolac) or opioids.

Conservative management for acute cholecystitis involves treating the infection without surgery. It is usually only considered in patients at very high risk for surgery or other interventions listed below. It consists of treatment with intravenous antibiotics and fluids.

=== ERCP ===
In ERCP, the endoscope enters through the mouth and passes through the stomach and start of the small intestine to reach the bile ducts.

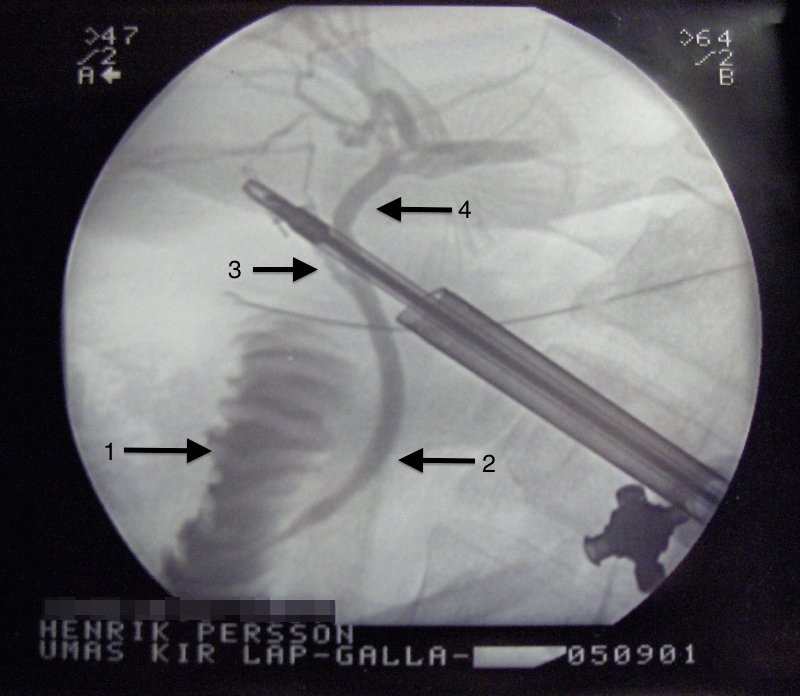
This is a cholangiogram, an x-ray of the bile ducts using contrast medium to make the bile ducts visible. 1 – Duodenum. 2 – Common bile duct. 3 – Cystic duct. 4 – Hepatic duct. The gallbladder is not seen as the cystic duct is occluded by a surgical instrument.

ERCP, short for endoscopic retrograde cholangiopancreatography, is an endoscopic procedure that can remove gallstones or prevent blockages by widening parts of the bile duct where gallstones frequently get stuck. ERCP is often used to retrieve stones stuck in the common bile duct in patients with gallstone pancreatitis or cholangitis. In this procedure, an endoscope, or small, long thin tube with a camera on the end, is passed through the mouth and down the esophagus. The doctor advances the camera through the stomach and into the first part of the small intestine to reach the opening of the bile duct. The doctor can inject a special, radiopaque dye through the endoscope into the bile duct to see stones or other blockages on x-ray. ERCP does not require general anaesthesia and can be done outside of the operating room. While ERCP can be used to remove a specific stone that is causing a blockage to allow drainage, it cannot remove all stones in the gallbladder. Thus, it is not considered a definitive treatment and people with recurrent complications from stones will still likely need a cholecystectomy.

=== Cholecystostomy ===
Cholecystostomy is the drainage of the gallbladder via insertion of a small tube through the abdominal wall. This is usually done using guidance from imaging scans to find the right place to insert the tube. Cholecystostomy can be used for people who need immediate drainage of the gallbladder but have a high risk of complications from surgery under general anaesthesia, such as elderly people and those with co-existing illnesses. Draining pus and infected material through the tube reduces inflammation in and around the gallbladder. It can be a lifesaving procedure, without requiring that the person undergo emergency surgery.

The procedure does come with significant risks and complications—in one retrospective study of patients who received percutaneous cholecystostomy for acute cholecystitis, 44% developed choledocholithiasis (one or more stones stuck in the common bile duct), 27% had tube dislodgment, and 23% developed postoperative abscess.

For some people, drainage with cholecystostomy is enough and they do not need to have the gallbladder removed later. For others, percutaneous cholecystostomy allows them to improve enough in the short term that they can get surgery at a later time. There is no clear evidence one way or another to indicate that surgical removal after cholecystostomy is best for high-risk surgical patients with acute cholecystitis.

== Frequency of use ==
About 600,000 people receive a cholecystectomy in the United States each year.

In a study of Medicaid-covered and uninsured U.S. hospital stays in 2012, cholecystectomy was the most common operating room procedure.

Gallstones affect approximately 10-15% of the global adult population, with the incidence rising with age and more commonly affecting women. As a result, cholecystectomy is one of the most common abdominal surgeries performed worldwide.

== History ==
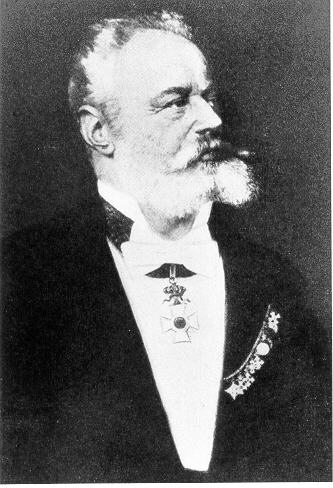
Carl Langenbuch performed the first successful cholecystectomy in 1882.

Carl Langenbuch performed the first successful cholecystectomy at the Lazarus hospital in Berlin on July 15, 1882. Before this, surgical therapy for symptomatic gallstones was limited to cholecystostomy, or gallstone removal. Langenbuch's rationale for developing the new technique stemmed from 17th century studies in dogs that demonstrated the gallbladder to be nonessential and medical opinion among his colleagues that gallstones formed in the gallbladder. Although the technique was initially controversial, cholecystectomy became established as a lower mortality procedure than cholecystostomy by the 20th century.

=== Laparoscopic technique ===
Erich Mühe performed the first laparoscopic cholecystectomy on September 12, 1985, in Böblingen, Germany. Mühe was inspired to develop a technique for laparoscopic cholecystectomy by the first laparoscopic appendectomy, performed by gynecologist Kurt Semm in 1980. He subsequently designed an optical laparoscope with a working channel large enough to fit a distended gallbladder. Mühe presented his technique to the Congress of the German Surgical Society in 1986, claiming reduced postoperative pain and shorter hospitalization. His work was met with strong resistance by the German surgical establishment and he had difficulty communicating it in English. It was consequently ignored. Mühe's work was further disparaged in 1987, when he was charged with manslaughter for a postoperative patient death that was mistakenly attributed to his innovative technique. He was exonerated in 1990 after further investigation. His pioneering work was eventually recognized by the German Surgical Society Congress in 1992.

Philippe Mouret performed laparoscopic cholecystectomy on March 17, 1987, in Lyon, France. His technique was rapidly adopted and improved in France. It was subsequently introduced to the rest of the world over the next three years. Driven by popularity among patients, the laparoscopic technique became preferred over open surgery and noninvasive treatments for gallstones.

By 2013, laparoscopic cholecystectomy had replaced open cholecystectomy as the first-choice of treatment for people with uncomplicated gallstones and acute cholecystitis.

By 2014 laparoscopic cholecystectomy had become the gold standard for the treatment of symptomatic gallstones.

Laparoscopic cholecystectomy can be technically challenging and requires surgeons to have advanced laparoscopic skills to perform the procedure safely and effectively.

== See also ==
- List of surgeries by type
- List of -ectomies
- Waltman Walter syndrome
