= Biliary fistula =

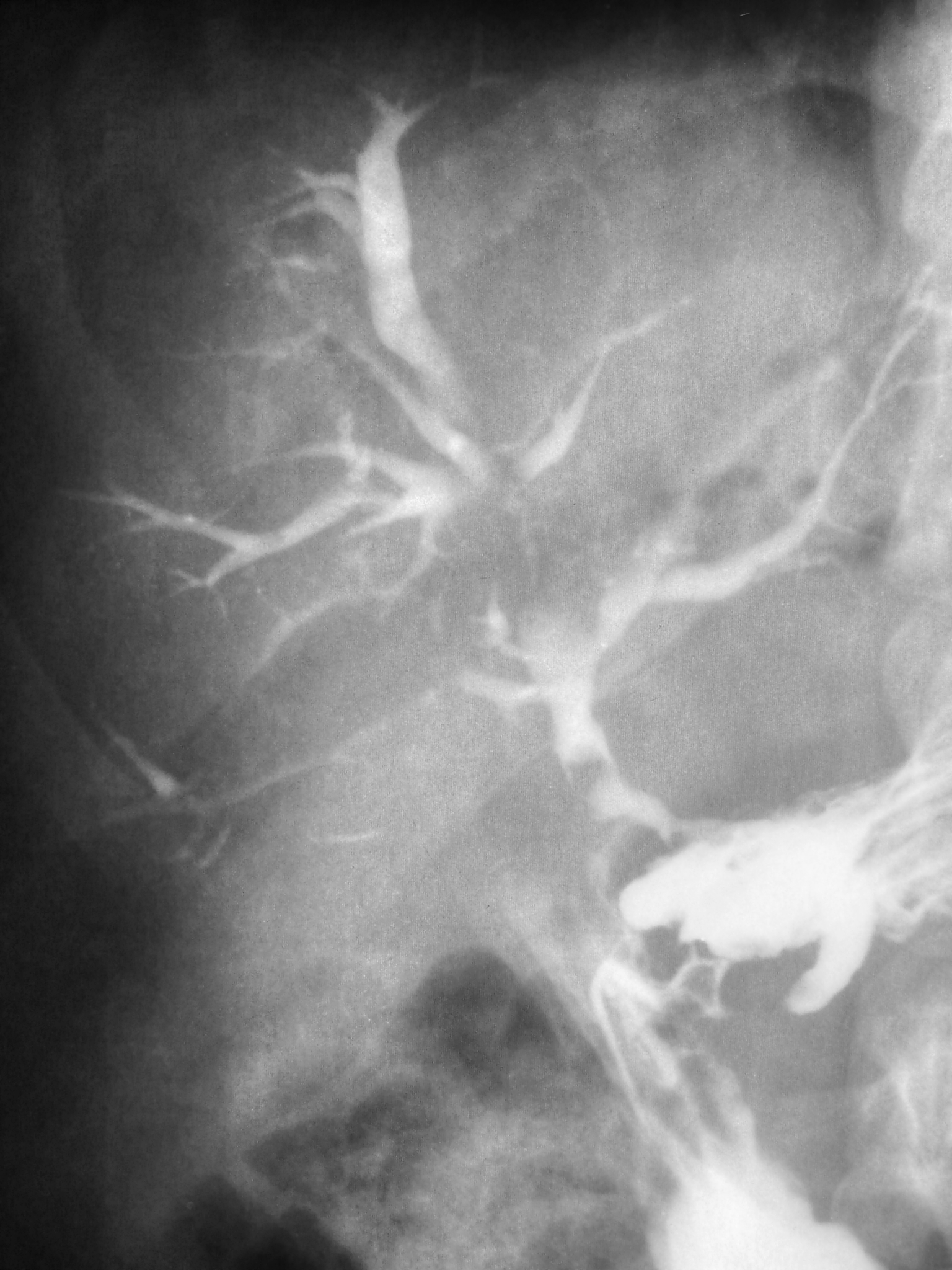
- Duodeno Biliary Fistula
- Specialty: General surgery

A biliary fistula is a type of fistula in which bile flows along an abnormal connection from the bile ducts into a nearby hollow structure. Types of biliary fistula include:

- bilioenteric fistula: abnormal connection to small bowel, usually duodenum.
- thoracobiliary fistula: abnormal connection to pleural space or bronchus (rare).
- bronchobiliary fistula: pathological communication between a bronchus and the biliary tract (extremely rare).

These may be contrasted to a bile leak, in which bile escapes the bile ducts through a perforation or faulty surgical anastomosis into the abdominal cavity. Damage to a bile duct may result in a leak, which may eventually become a biliary fistula.

== Signs and symptoms ==
A biliary fistula often occurs or may be suspected in a person who has recently undergone a surgical procedure. Pain may occur if the leaked bile is also infected, which can subsequently lead to biliary peritonitis.

Brochobilary fistula is challenging because patients may experience repeat chest infections, pleural effusion, and perihepatic abdominal collection. Such patients usually present with bilioptysis (presence of bile in sputum), persistent cough, chest infections, or respiratory distress due to pleural effusion. Bilioptysis is the pathognomonic clinical feature of BBF.

Extensive ascites may accumulate, especially in the setting of sterile bile leakage, which is often asymptomatic in nature.

== Causes ==
It can occur as a complication following biliary trauma (such as cholelithiasis), as an iatrogenic effect or as a result of a penetrating injury. Bronchobilary fistula commonly caused by primary and metastatic tumors, bile duct obstruction secondary to biliary stenosis, cholangiolithiasis, hepatic hydatidosis and trauma.

== Diagnosis ==
For bronchobiliary fistula, the following tests are performed: 1) ultrasound abdomen, may show subdiaphragmatic collection around the surface of the right lobe of the liver. 2) preoperative chest X-ray, may demonstrate mild to moderate right-sided pleural effusion without an active lung pathology. 3) CT scan, may reveal focal collection along the liver's right lateral margin, which can be communicating with one of the right lower lobe bronchi, supporting the diagnosis of a BBF.

== Treatment ==
Cholecystectomy with a choledochoplasty is the most frequent treatment of primary fistulas, whereas the bile duct drainage or the endoscopic stenting is the best choice in case of minor iatrogenic bile duct injuries.

== See also ==
- Biliary injury
- Gallstone ileus
