= German Society of Surgery =

Logo.

The German Society of Surgery (German: Deutsche Gesellschaft für Chirurgie) is a German medical organization.

It was founded in 1872 and is one of the oldest medical-scientific learned societies. It is headquartered in Berlin and is headed by president Joachim Jähne and secretary-general Hans-Joachim Meyer.
