= Lymph trunk =

Lymph trunk is a collection of lymph vessels that carries lymph, and is formed by confluence of many efferent lymph vessels. It in turn drains into one of the two lymph ducts (right lymph duct and the thoracic duct).

When an efferent lymph vessel leaves a lymph node, it may carry lymph to another lymph node by becoming its afferent lymph vessel or unite with other efferent vessels to become a lymph trunk. The lymph trunks drain into the lymph ducts, which in turn return lymph to the blood by emptying into the respective subclavian veins.

== Classification ==
There are five pairs and an unpaired lymph trunk:

- Jugular lymph trunks
- Subclavian lymph trunks
- Bronchomediastinal lymph trunks
- Lumbar lymph trunks
- Intercostal lymph trunks
- Intestinal lymph trunk (unpaired)
