= Bronchomediastinal lymph trunk =

Lymph node

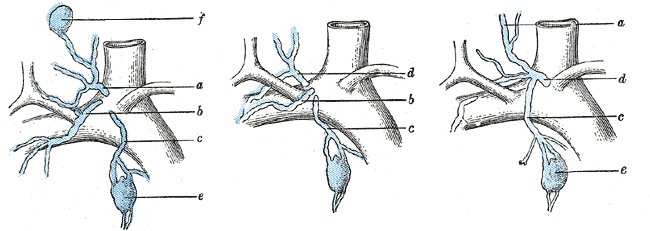
- Terminal collecting trunks of right side. a. Jugular trunk. b. Subclavian trunk. c. Bronchomediastinal trunk. d. Right lymphatic trunk. e. Gland of internal mammary chain. f. Gland of deep cervical chain.

Details
- System: Lymphatic system
- Source: Parasternal lymph nodes
- Drains to: Thoracic duct, right lymphatic duct

Identifiers
- Latin: truncus bronchomediastinalis
- TA98: A12.4.01.005
- FMA: 9585

The bronchomediastinal lymph trunks are essential components of the human lymphatic system, tasked with draining lymph from the tracheobronchial, internal mammary, and anterior mediastinal lymph nodes.

Located in the mediastinum, the central part of the thoracic cavity, these trunks form from the convergence of efferent vessels that ascend along the trachea. Typically, there are two trunks - one on each side of the body. The right bronchomediastinal trunk may connect the right lymphatic duct, and the left trunk to the thoracic duct, although more frequently, they open independently into the junction of the internal jugular vein and subclavian veins on their respective sides.

Functionally, the bronchomediastinal lymph trunks are pivotal in transporting lymph, which includes lymphocytes and other immune cells, from the thorax to the bloodstream. This process is crucial for immune surveillance and maintaining fluid balance within the body. Clinically, these trunks are significant for their role in the potential spread of diseases, particularly thoracic cancers, making them important landmarks in oncological diagnostics and treatment planning.

== Anatomy ==
=== Location and Structure ===
The bronchomediastinal lymph trunks are situated in the mediastinum - the central part of the thoracic cavity. Each trunk extends from the thoracic inlet to the root of the neck, positioned laterally. These trunks are formed by the convergence of lymphatic vessels that drain lymph from the heart, lungs, trachea, and pleura, as well as from the internal mammary and anterior mediastinal lymph nodes.

The lymphatic vessels merge to form each trunk, which typically drains into the venous system. The left bronchomediastinal lymph trunk often empties into the thoracic duct or directly into the venous angle, where the internal jugular and subclavian veins converge. Similarly, the right trunk may connect to the right lymphatic duct or end at the right venous angle. The proximity of these trunks to major vascular structures highlights their significance in lymphatic drainage and immune function.

=== Variations ===
Anatomical variations in the bronchomediastinal lymph trunks are common and can have significant clinical relevance, particularly in the context of disease spread and surgical interventions.

Number and Size of Trunks: Individuals may present with variations in the number and size of these trunks. While typically there is one trunk on each side, some individuals may have multiple smaller trunks or a single trunk that may serve both sides. These variations can influence the efficiency of lymph drainage and immune responses.

Confluence with Lymphatic and Venous Systems: The drainage patterns into the thoracic duct or directly into the venous system can vary among individuals. Atypical connections with other lymphatic structures or unusual terminations into the venous system may alter normal lymphatic flow and complicate medical or surgical management.

Drainage Territories: Although these trunks generally drain the mediastinum, lungs, and associated structures, the specific regions of the thorax drained by each trunk can vary. This is particularly important in surgical settings, such as during lymph node dissections or in evaluating the lymphatic spread of thoracic cancers.

== Function ==
The bronchomediastinal lymph trunks are essential components of the lymphatic system, responsible for the efficient drainage of lymph from various thoracic structures, such as the lungs, heart, and trachea, to the venous system. This function is crucial for maintaining fluid balance, facilitating immune responses, and ensuring the clearance of metabolic waste and foreign particles from the body.

=== Lymph Drainage and Immune Surveillance ===
The primary role of the bronchomediastinal lymph trunks is to transport lymph, which contains proteins, lipids, and immune cells such as lymphocytes, from the thoracic organs, including the lungs, heart, trachea, and esophagus, to the bloodstream. These trunks act as major conduits for lymph to reach larger lymphatic ducts or directly enter the venous circulation at the venous angle.

This transportation process is vital for immune surveillance, as it enables the movement of lymphocytes and antigen-presenting cells to lymph nodes where they can detect and respond to pathogens or malignancies located within the thoracic region. This activity is crucial for initiating appropriate immune responses or establishing immune tolerance.

=== Regulation of Fluid Homeostasis ===
In addition to their immune functions, the bronchomediastinal lymph trunks also play a pivotal role in regulating fluid homeostasis. They facilitate the reabsorption and return of interstitial fluid to the bloodstream, helping to maintain normal blood volume and pressure. Dysfunctions in these trunks can lead to conditions such as lymphedema, characterized by the accumulation of fluid in tissues, causing swelling.

=== Transport of Lipids ===
Lymph trunks are also involved in the transport of lipids, particularly those absorbed from the gastrointestinal tract that are too large to directly enter the venous system. These lipids are transported in the form of chylomicrons via the lymphatic system to the bloodstream.
