= Parasternal lymph nodes =

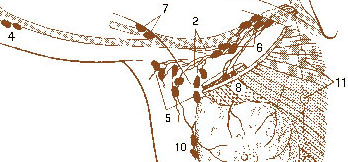
- 2. Axillary lymphatic plexus 4. Cubital lymph nodes (not part of the lymph node drainage of the breast); 5. Superficial axillary (low axillary); 6. Deep axillary lymph nodes 7. Brachial axillary lymph nodes 8. Interpectoral axillary lymph nodes (Rotter nodes); 10. Paramammary or intramammary lymph nodes 11. Parasternal lymph nodes (internal mammary nodes)

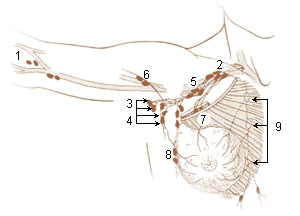
- Axillary lymph nodes 2. Apical axillary 3 & 4. Lateral (surface) axillary 5. Central axillary 6. Brachial axillary 7. Interpectoral; 8. Paramammary; 9. Parasternal (internal mammary)

Details
- System: Lymphatic system
- Drains to: Bronchomediastinal trunk

Identifiers
- Latin: nodi lymphoidei parasternales
- TA98: A13.3.02.003
- TA2: 5250
- FMA: 71760

The parasternal lymph nodes (or sternal glands) are placed at the anterior ends of the intercostal spaces, by the side of the internal thoracic artery.

They derive afferents from the mamma; from the deeper structures of the anterior abdominal wall above the level of the umbilicus; from the upper surface of the liver through a small group of glands which lie behind the xiphoid process; and from the deeper parts of the anterior portion of the thoracic wall.

Their efferents usually unite to form a single trunk on either side; this may open directly into the junction of the internal jugular and subclavian veins, or that of the right side may join the right subclavian trunk, and that of the left the thoracic duct. The parasternal lymph nodes drain into the bronchomediastinal trunks, in a similar fashion to the upper intercostal lymph nodes.
