= Superior diaphragmatic lymph nodes =

Group of lymph nodes of the thorax

Details

Identifiers
- Latin: nodi lymphoidei phrenici superiores

The superior diaphragmatic lymph nodes lie on the thoracic aspect of the diaphragm, and consist of three sets – anterior, middle, and posterior.

- The anterior set comprises (a) two or three small nodes behind the base of the xiphoid process, which receive afferents from the convex surface of the liver, and (b) one or two nodes on either side near the junction of the seventh rib with its cartilage, which receive lymphatic vessels from the front part of the diaphragm. The efferent vessels of the anterior set pass to the parasternal lymph nodes.
- The middle set consists of two or three nodes on either side close to where the phrenic nerves enter the diaphragm. On the right side some of the lymph nodes of this group lie within the fibrous sac of the pericardium, on the front of the termination of the inferior vena cava. The afferents of this set are derived from the middle part of the diaphragm, those on the right side also receiving afferents from the convex surface of the liver. Their efferents pass to the posterior mediastinal lymph nodes.
- The posterior set consists of a few nodes situated on the back of the crura of the diaphragm, and connected on one side with the lumbar lymph nodes and on the other with the posterior mediastinal nodes.
