= Timothy Clarke =

English physician

Timothy Clarke (died 1672) was an English physician, a founding Fellow of the Royal Society.

== Life ==
He was a member of Balliol College, Oxford at the time of the parliamentary visitation in May 1648. He refused to submit, but was allowed to proceed M.D. on 20 July 1652. He was admitted a candidate of the College of Physicians on 26 June 1654, and a fellow on 20 October 1664.

Clarke had some celebrity in his day as an anatomist. He enjoyed the favour of Charles II, before whom, as Samuel Pepys records, he conducted some dissections, ‘with which the king was highly pleased’. He had already (December 1660) been chosen physician in ordinary to the royal household, and on 7 March 1663 was gazetted physician to the newly raised armed forces within the kingdom. On the death of Dr. Quartermaine in June 1667, Clarke was appointed second physician in ordinary to the king, with the reversion of Dr. George Bate's place as chief physician; and was named an elect of the College on 24 January 1670 in place of the late Sir Edward Alston. He had been incorporated at Cambridge on his doctor's degree in 1668.

Clarke died at his house in St. Martin's-in-the-Fields on 11 February 1672, leaving no issue. His will, dated two days before, was proved on 28 March following by his wife Frances.

== Works ==
Clarke was one of the original Fellows of the Royal Society, and is named in the charter one of the first council. He wrote a long Latin dissertation in the Philosophical Transactions of 1668 (iii. 672–82), in which he tries to prove that Dr. George Joyliffe was the first discoverer of the lymphatic vessels. He had also in preparation a work giving an account of his own original investigations in anatomy, which was to have been published at the expense of the Society, but this he did not live to complete.
