= Gorham's disease =

Syndrome characterized by bone loss

- Other names: Acro-osteolysis syndrome, Breschet-Gorham-Stout syndrome, Cystic angiomatosis of bone, Disappearing bone disease, Disseminated lymphangiomatosis, Disseminated osseous bone disease, Essential osteolysis, Gorham-Stout syndrome, Gorham's lymphangiomatosis, Hemangiomata with osteolysis, Idiopathic massive osteolysis, Massive osteolysis, Morbus-Gorham-Stout disease, Osteolysis and angiomatous nevi, Skeletal lymphangiomatosis, Skeletal hemangiomatosis, Thoracic lymphangiomatosis.
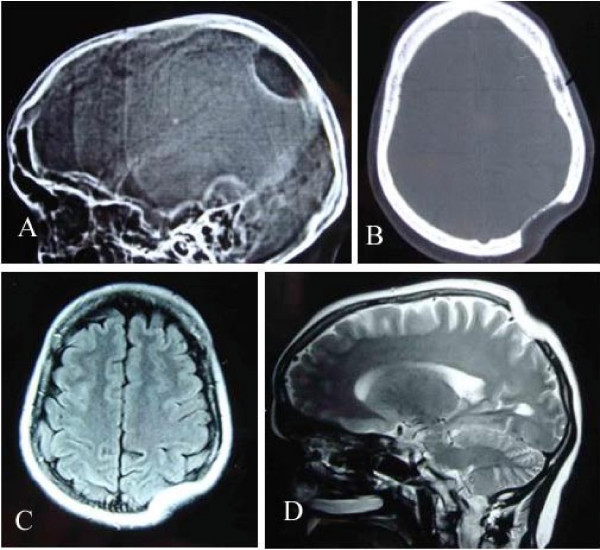
- Gorham's disease involving the left parietal bone: X-ray of the skull lateral view (A) showing a osteolytic area in left parietal region. CT scan bony window (B), MRI T1W Axial (C) and T2W Sagittal (D) revealing skull defect with normal brain parenchyma.
- Specialty: Rheumatology

Gorham's disease (pronounced GOR-amz), also known as Gorham vanishing bone disease and phantom bone disease, is a very rare skeletal condition of unknown cause. It is characterized by the uncontrolled proliferation of distended, thin-walled vascular or lymphatic channels within bone, which leads to resorption and replacement of bone with angiomas and/or fibrosis.

== Signs and symptoms ==
The symptoms of Gorham's disease vary depending on the bones involved. It may affect any part of the skeleton, but the most common sites of disease are the shoulder, skull, pelvic girdle, jaw, ribs, and spine.

In some cases, no symptoms are seen until a fracture occurs either spontaneously or following minor trauma, such as a fall. An acute onset of localized pain and swelling may occur. More commonly, pain of no apparent cause increases in frequency and intensity over time and may eventually be accompanied by weakness and noticeable deformity of the area. The rate of progression is unpredictable, and the prognosis can be difficult. The disease may stabilize after a number of years, go into spontaneous remission, or in cases involving the chest and upper spine, prove fatal. Recurrence of the disease following remission can also occur. Involvement of the spine and skull base may cause a poor outcome from neurological complications. In many cases, the result of Gorham's disease is severe deformity and functional disability.

Symptoms such as difficulty breathing and chest pain may be present if the disease is present in the ribs, scapula, or thoracic vertebrae. These may indicate that the disease has spread from the bone into the chest cavity. The breathing problems may be misdiagnosed as asthma, because the damage done to the lungs can cause the same types of changes to lung function testing as seen in asthma. Extension of the lesions into the chest may lead to the development of chylous pleural and pericardial effusions. Chyle is rich in protein and white blood cells that are important in fighting infection. The loss of chyle into the chest can have serious consequences, including infection, malnutrition, and respiratory distress and failure. These complications or their symptoms, such as difficulty breathing, chest pain, poor growth or weight loss, and infection have sometimes been the first indications of the condition.

== Causes ==
The specific cause of Gorham's disease remains unknown. Bone mass and strength are obtained and maintained through a lifelong process of bone destruction and replacement that occurs at the cellular level. Cells called osteoclasts secrete enzymes that dissolve old bone, allowing another type of cells called osteoblasts to form new bone. Except in growing bone, the rate of breakdown equals the rate of building, thereby maintaining bone mass. In Gorham's disease, that process is disrupted.

Gorham and Stout found that vascular anomalies always occupied space that normally would be filled with new bone and speculated that the presence of angiomatosis may lead to chemical changes in the bone. Gorham and others speculated that such a change in the bone chemistry might cause an imbalance in the rate of osteoclast to osteoblast activity such that more bone is dissolved than is replaced. Beginning in the 1990s, elevated levels of a protein called interleukin-6 (IL-6) being detected in people with the disease were reported, leading some to suggest that increased levels of IL-6 and vascular endothelial growth factor (VEGF) may contribute to the chemical changes Gorham and others believed were the cause of this type of osteolysis.

In 1999, Möller and colleagues concluded, "The Gorham-Stout syndrome may be, essentially, a monocentric bone disease with a focally increased bone resorption due to an increased number of paracrine – or autocrine – stimulated hyperactive osteoclasts. The resorbed bone is replaced by a markedly vascularized fibrous tissue. The apparent contradiction concerning the presence or absence or the number of osteoclasts, may be explained by the different phases of the syndrome." They further stated that their histopathological study provided good evidence that osteolytic changes seen in Gorham's disease are the result of hyperactive osteoclastic bone. However, others have concluded that lymphangiomatosis and Gorham's disease should be considered as a spectrum of disease rather than separate diseases.

While a consensus exists that Gorham's is caused by deranged osteoclastic activity, no conclusive evidence has been found as to what causes this behavior to begin.

== Diagnosis ==
In 1983, Heffez and colleagues published a case report in which they suggested eight criteria for a definitive diagnosis of Gorham's disease:

- Positive biopsy with the presence of angiomatous tissue
- Absence of cellular atypia
- Minimal or no osteoblastic response or dystrophic calcifications
- Evidence of local bone progressive osseous resorption
- Nonexpansile, nonulcerative lesions
- No involvement of viscera
- Osteolytic radiographic pattern
- Negative hereditary, metabolic, neoplastic, immunologic, or infectious etiology

In the early stages of the disease, X-rays reveal changes resembling patchy osteoporosis. As the disease progresses, bone deformity occurs with further loss of bone mass, and in the tubular bones (the long bones of the arms and legs), a concentric shrinkage is often seen which has been described as having a "sucked candy" appearance. Once the cortex (the outer shell) of the bone has been disrupted, vascular channels may invade adjacent soft tissues and joints. Eventually, complete or near-complete resorption of the bone occurs and may extend to adjacent bones, though spontaneous arrest of bone loss has been reported on occasion. Throughout this process, as the bone is destroyed, it is replaced by angiomatous and/or fibrous tissue.

Often, Gorham's disease is not recognized until a fracture occurs, with subsequent improper bone healing. The diagnosis is essentially one of exclusion and must be based on combined clinical, radiological, and histopathological findings. X-rays, CT scans, MRIs, ultrasounds, and nuclear medicine (bone scans) are all important tools in the diagnostic workup and surgical planning, but none has the ability alone to produce a definitive diagnosis. Surgical biopsy with histological identification of the vascular or lymphatic proliferation within a generous section of the affected bone is an essential component in the diagnostic process.

Recognition of the disease requires a high index of suspicion and an extensive workup. Because of its serious morbidity, Gorham's must always be considered in the differential diagnosis of osteolytic lesions.

== Management ==
Treatment of Gorham's disease is for the most part palliative and limited to symptom management.

Sometimes, the bone destruction spontaneously ceases and no treatment is required, but when the disease is progressive, aggressive intervention may be necessary. Duffy and colleagues reported that around 17% of people with Gorham's disease in the ribs, shoulder, or upper spine experience extension of the disease into the chest, leading to chylothorax with its serious consequences, and that the mortality rate in this group can reach as high as 64% without surgical intervention.

A search of the medical literature reveals multiple case reports of interventions with varying rates of success as follows:

Cardiothoracic (heart and lung):

- Pleurodesis
- Ligation of thoracic duct
- Pleurperitoneal shunt
- Radiation therapy
- Pleurectomy
- Surgical resection
- Thalidomide
- Interferon alpha-2b
- TPN (total parenteral nutrition)
- Thoracentesis
- Diet rich in medium-chain triglycerides and protein
- Chemotherapy
- Sclerotherapy
- Transplantation

Skeletal:

- Interferon alpha-2b
- Bisphosphonate (e.g. pamidronate)
- Surgical resection
- Radiation therapy
- Sclerotherapy
- Percutaneous bone cement
- Bone graft
- Prosthesis
- Surgical stabilization
- Amputation

To date, no known interventions are consistently effective for Gorham's, and all reported interventions are considered experimental treatments, though many are routine for other conditions. Some people may require a combination of these approaches. Unfortunately, some people will not respond to any intervention.

== Epidemiology ==
Gorham's disease is extremely rare and may occur at any age, though it is most often recognized in children and young adults. It strikes males and females of all races and exhibits no inheritance pattern. The medical literature contains case reports from every continent. Because it is so rare, and commonly misdiagnosed, exactly how many people are affected by this disease is not known. The literature frequently cites that fewer than 200 cases have been reported, though a consensus is building that many more cases occur around the world than have been reported.

== History ==
The first known report of Gorham-Stout disease came in 1838 in an article titled "A Boneless Arm" in what was then The Boston Medical and Surgical Journal (now The New England Journal of Medicine). It is a brief report chronicling the case of Mr. Brown who had, in 1819 at age 18 years, broken his right upper arm in an accident. The person had two subsequent accidents, which fractured the arm twice more "before the curative process had been completed." At the time of the report in 1838, the person was reported as having remarkable use of the arm, in spite of the humerus bone having apparently disappeared – X-rays did not yet exist. Thirty-four years later, a follow-up report was published in the same journal, following Mr. Brown's death from pneumonia at the age of 70 years. The person had requested the arm "be dissected and preserved for the benefit of medical science" and this report contains a detailed pathological description of the arm and shoulder. Abnormalities of the remaining bones of the arm and shoulder are noted and the authors report that the arteries, veins, and nerves appeared normal. No mention was made of lymphatic vessels. Though several reports of similar cases were published in the interim, more than 80 years passed before another significant report of the condition appeared in the medical literature.

Both born in 1885, Lemuel Whittington Gorham, MD, and Arthur Purdy Stout, MD, had long, distinguished careers in medicine and shared a lifelong interest in pathology. Dr. Gorham practiced and taught medicine and oncology and from the mid-1950s through the early 1960s conducted and reported the classical clinicopathological investigations of pulmonary embolism. During this time, he also authored several case series on osteolysis of bone. Dr. Stout began his career as a surgeon and became a pioneer in tumor pathology, publishing Human Cancer in 1932. This work became the model for the Atlas of Tumor Pathology project, which Stout oversaw as chairman of the National Research Council in the 1950s. In his later years, Dr. Stout embarked on a systematic study of soft tissue tumors in children and was among the first to link cigarette smoking to lung cancer.

In 1954, Gorham and three others published a two case series, with a brief review of 16 similar cases from the medical literature, that advanced the hypothesis that angiomatosis was responsible for this unusual form of massive osteolysis. That same year, Gorham and Stout presented to the American Association of Physicians their paper (in abstract form), "Massive Osteolysis (Acute Spontaneous Absorption of Bone, Phantom Bone, Disappearing Bone): Its Relation to Hemangiomatosis". The paper was published in its entirety in October 1955 in The Journal of Bone and Joint Surgery, concluding that:

1. There now exists the basis for a new syndrome which is supported by a remarkable similarity of clinical and [x-ray] findings in twenty-four cases, and by an equally convincing similarity of the histological picture in eight of these, which we have personally studied.
2. However it is accomplished, the progressive osteolysis is always associated with an angiomatosis of blood and sometimes of lymphatic vessels, which seemingly are responsible for it.

The most typical presentation is that of osteolysis of a single bone or the bones connected by a shared joint, such as the shoulder. Although the disease can attack any bone, the shoulder is one of the most commonly involved areas, along with the skull and pelvic girdle. Spontaneous fractures are common and may be the first sign of the disease. A hallmark of the disease is the lack of bone healing following fracture.
