= Lymph heart =

Lymph pumping organ in some vertebrates

A lymph heart is an organ which pumps lymph in lungfishes, amphibians, reptiles, and flightless birds back into the circulatory system. In some amphibian species, lymph hearts are in pairs, and may number as many as 200 in one animal the size of a worm, while newts and salamanders have as many as 16 to 23 pairs of lymph hearts.

Lymph hearts are thought to have evolved in Rhipidistia. Mammals have lost the lymph heart as a centralized organ, instead having the lymph vessels themselves contract to pump lymph.

== In frogs and other amphibians ==
The lymphatic system of a frog consists of lymph, lymph vessels, lymph heart, lymph spaces and spleen.

=== Lymphatics and lymph ===
As lymph is a filtrate of blood, it closely resembles the plasma in its water content. Lymph also contains a small amount of metabolic waste and a much smaller amount of protein than that of blood. Lymph vessels carry the lymph and, in the frog, open into the four lymph hearts. These lymph hearts are located on the dorsal side of frog's body. The front pair is situated below the shoulder blades. The posterior pair is on either side of a long, rod-like bone called a urostyle, formed by the fusion of the last few vertebrae. The anterior pair opens into the subclavian vein and the posterior pair into the femoral vein. The pair near the third vertebra pumps lymph into the jugular vein. The other pair at the end of the vertebral column pump lymph into the iliac vein in the legs.

The position of mammalian jugular lymph sacs coincide with that of amphibian anterior lymph hearts.

=== Mechanism of the lymph hearts ===
The lymph hearts rhythmically and slowly pump to drive the lymph into the veins. It is possible to see the lymph hearts beat by looking on the dorsal surface on either side of the urostyle. In the toad, the normal lymph heart rate is about 50 beats per minute. Thus the lymph emerging out of blood ultimately merges into the blood. It returns the proteins back to blood.

Amphibian lymph hearts are made up from three tissue layers analogous to the three layers of blood vessels. There are the tunica interna intima made up of endothelial cells, tunica media made up of muscle, and the tunica externa for anchor to organs. The MyoD-expressing muscle is developmentally more similar to skeletal muscle than to heart muscle.

== In fish ==
There was great debate as to whether teleost fish have a lymphatic system. Current evidence shows that they likely have a "primitive" version. They do not seem to have lymph hearts, instead using blood pressure to move lymph.

Lungfish, which are more related to tetrapods, use multiple "micropumps" to move lymph around, reaching densities as high as 100 per cubic millimeter in the fins of South American lungfish.

== Lymph heart size and pump rate ==
These hearts vary in size from microscopic in lungfish to an estimated 20-liter capacity in some of the largest dinosaurs. In newts, frogs and turtles they pump at rates higher than the blood heart and the volumes pumped are quite remarkable. In toads and frogs, this volume can amount to about 1/50 the output of blood from the heart. In amphibians, lymph hearts lie at vein junctions. Frogs and salamanders have 10 to 20 lymph hearts, while caecilians have more than 100. Conversely, reptiles have a single pair of lymph hearts in the pelvic area. In flightless (ratite) birds, the lymph heart function is less clear and the two almond-sized hearts located near the spinal column close to the hip joint are thought to be involved in inflating and deflating the phallus with lymph, which is of a significant size in both sexes of emus and ostriches.
