= George Joyliffe =

English anatomist and physician

George Joyliffe FRCP (1621–1658), sometimes Latinised as Iolivius or Jolivius, was an English anatomist and physician. He discovered the lymphatics of the liver in collaboration with Glisson and was one of three (together with Rudbeck and Bartholine) to have discovered the lymphatic system independently at about the same time.

== Life ==
=== Origins and education ===
George Joyliffe, the son of John Joyliffe of East Stower, Dorsetshire, was born there in 1621. In 1637, when sixteen years old, he became a member of Wadham College, Oxford, but migrated to Pembroke College, whence he graduated BA in June 1640, and MA in April 1643. He served as a lieutenant in the Royal Army under Lord Hopton in 1643. He studied medicine under Thomas Clayton, Master of Pembroke College, and Regius Professor of Physic, and in April 1650 entered Clare Hall, Cambridge, as a fellow-commoner, became acquainted with Francis Glisson, the Regius Professor of Physic, and took the degree of MD on 1 July 1652.

=== Discovery of the lymphatics ===
Joyliffe told Glisson when he called on him to make the necessary arrangements for graduation, that besides arteries, veins, and nerves, a fourth and distinct set of vessels existed, distributed to several parts of the body, and containing a watery humour. He had, he said, made out these vessels in numerous animals and in several parts of the body, and he was sure that the fluid contained in them moved towards the mesentery, and especially towards the beginning of it. Glisson's statement, first published in 1654, is conclusive evidence as to the originality of Joyliffe's anatomical discovery of the lymph ducts, and was no doubt made then because of the publications of Rudbeck (Exercitatio exhibens ductus Hepaticos Aquosos et Vasa Glandularum Serosa, Westeräs, 1653) and of Thomas Bartholinus (Vasa Lymphatica, Copenhagen, 1653), both anatomists who had also dissected out the main lymphatic trunks. Joyliffe did not himself make his discovery known in print.

=== Later life and death ===
Joyliffe was admitted a Candidate of the College of Physicians on 4 April 1653, lectured there on the vasa lymphatica, and was elected a Fellow on 25 June 1658. His house was on Garlick Hill, London, and there he died on 11 November 1658.
