= Lymph sacs =

Part of the development of the lymphatic system, known as lymphangiogenesis

Details
- System: Lymphatic system

Identifiers
- Latin: sacci lymphatici
- TE: sacs_by_E5.11.2.3.0.0.13 E5.11.2.3.0.0.13

Lymph sacs are a part of the development of the lymphatic system, known as lymphangiogenesis. The lymph sacs are precursors of the lymph vessels. These sacs develop through the processes of vasculogenesis and angiogenesis. However, there is evidence of both of these processes in different organisms. In mice, it is thought that the lymphatic components form through an angiogenic process. But, there is evidence from bird embryos that gives rise to the idea that lymphatic vessels arise in the embryos through a vasculogenesis-like process from the lymphangioblastic endothelial precursor cells.

The development of the lymphatic system has been a highly debated topic in developmental biology for a long time. Previously, it was debated whether the lymph sacs developed from the venous system, or if they came from spaces in the mesenchyme, which come together in a centripetal direction and secondarily opened into the veins. However, more recent research has shown that the formation of the lymphatic system begins when a subset of endothelial cells from the previously formed jugular vein sprout off to form the lymphatic sacs. Because lymph sacs form from the venous system, they typically contain red blood cells. It is believed that the lymph sacs are directly connected to the venous system and that the venous components and lymphatic components communicate through a small hole. Studies have shown that the development of lymph sacs occurs through swelling and outgrowth of pre-lymphatic clusters from the cardinal vein, in a process termed ballooning. Following ballooning, there is the process of pinching, which separates the lymph sacs from the venous system.

These processes begin forming the lymph sacs during the 5th week of fetal development. At this time, the jugular lymph sacs develop. These are a pair of enlargements that function in collecting fluid from the lymphatics of the upper limbs, upper trunk, head, and neck. The lymph nodes eventually develop at the place of the jugular lymphatic sacs. From the left jugular lymphatic sac, the cervical part of the thoracic duct forms. From the right jugular lymphatic sac, the right lymphatic duct and the jugular and the subclavicular lymphatic trunks form. One week later, during the 6th week of fetal development, four more lymph sacs form. These are the retroperitoneal lymph sac, the cysterna chyli, and paired posterior lymph sacs. The posterior lymph sacs are associated with the junctions of the external and internal iliac veins. These four new lymph sacs function in the collection of lymph from the trunk and lower extremities of the body. The cysterna chyli drains into a pair of thoracic lymphatic ducts initially. These ducts drain into the venous junctions of the internal jugular and subclavian veins. However, these ducts eventually become one thoracic duct that is derived from the caudal portion of the right duct, the cranial portion of the left duct, and median anastomosis.

There are many transcription factors that regulate the development of the lymphatic system, particularly the lymph sacs, but in all of the migrating lymphatic endothelial cell precursors, there is one specific factor present, Prospero-related homeobox-1 (PROX1). Homologs of this transcription factor have been found in humans, chicks, newts, frogs, Drosophila, and zebrafish. When the development of the lymphatic system begins from the cardinal vein, all of the endothelial cells appear to have the potential to become lymphatic. This potential is indicated by the presence of some known lymphatic markers such as Vascular endothelial growth factor receptor-3 (Vegfr3 or Flt4; a receptor for VegfC and VegfD), and also the presence of Lyve1, which is a lymphatic specific hyluronan receptor. However, regardless of the presence of these markers, it appears that only the subset of endothelial cells that begin to express Prox1 form the undeveloped lymph sacs. Once these cells start to express Prox1, they begin to express more specific lymphatic markers such as Nrp2 and Podoplanin.

Many experiments involving mice have proven the importance of the Prox1 transcription factor in the development of primitive lymph sacs. In experiments where Prox1 was knocked out in mice, the embryos were unable to form any lymphatic system. However, even when the mice did not have any Prox1, the endothelial cells still migrate similarly to the way they would when developing a lymphatic system, but as these cells migrate, they never develop the ability to express the more specific lymphatic markers. Instead, they will begin to express markers that are specific to blood vessel endothelium. These markers include CD34 and Laminin. This experiment proves that Prox1 is necessary for lymphatic cells to specify. It is believed that Prox1 is the single most important transcription factor that programs the fate of endothelial cells becoming lymphatic components. It has also been found that ectopic expression of Prox1 in blood vascular epithelium can force vascular endothelial cells to convert into lymphatic cells. It has been observed that lymph nodes often develop at locations where blood vessels bifurcate, indicating that signals required for blood vessel branching might also contribute to the formation of lymph nodes.
