= Subclavian lymph trunk =

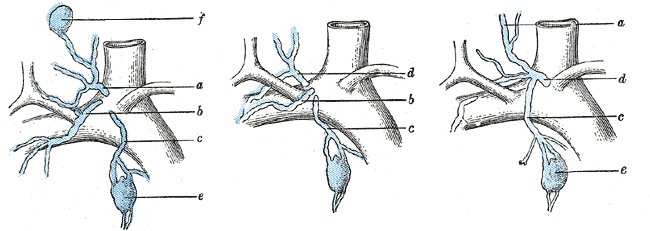
- Terminal collecting trunks of right side. a. Jugular trunk. b. Subclavian trunk. c. Bronchomediastinal trunk. d. Right lymphatic trunk. e. Gland of internal mammary chain. f. Gland of deep cervical chain.

Details
- System: Lymphatic system
- Source: Axillary lymph nodes
- Drains to: Thoracic duct, right lymphatic duct

Identifiers
- Latin: truncus subclavius
- TA98: A12.4.01.003
- FMA: 12252

The efferent vessels of the subclavicular group unite to form the subclavian trunk, which opens either directly into the junction of the internal jugular and subclavian veins or into the jugular lymphatic trunk; on the left side it may end in the thoracic duct.
