= Lymphangiogenesis =

Formation of lymphatic vessels from pre-existing vessels

Identifiers
- MeSH: D042583

Lymphangiogenesis is the formation of lymphatic vessels from pre-existing lymphatic vessels in a method believed to be similar to angiogenesis (blood vessel development).

Lymphangiogenesis plays an important physiological role in homeostasis, metabolism and immunity. Impaired or excessive lymphatic vessel formation has been implicated in a number of pathological conditions including neoplasm metastasis, oedema, rheumatoid arthritis, psoriasis, lymphangiomatosis and impaired wound healing.

The role of the lymphatic system in these diseases has received renewed interest largely due to the discovery of lymphatic endothelial cell (LEC)-specific markers such as podoplanin, LYVE-1, PROX1, desmoplakin and VEGF-C receptor VEGFR-3. These specific markers have enabled insights into functional and molecular lymphatic biology. There are several known pro-lymphangiogenesis inducers such as VEGF-C, hyaluronic acid and ephrin-B2.
