= Venous angle =

Junction between veins

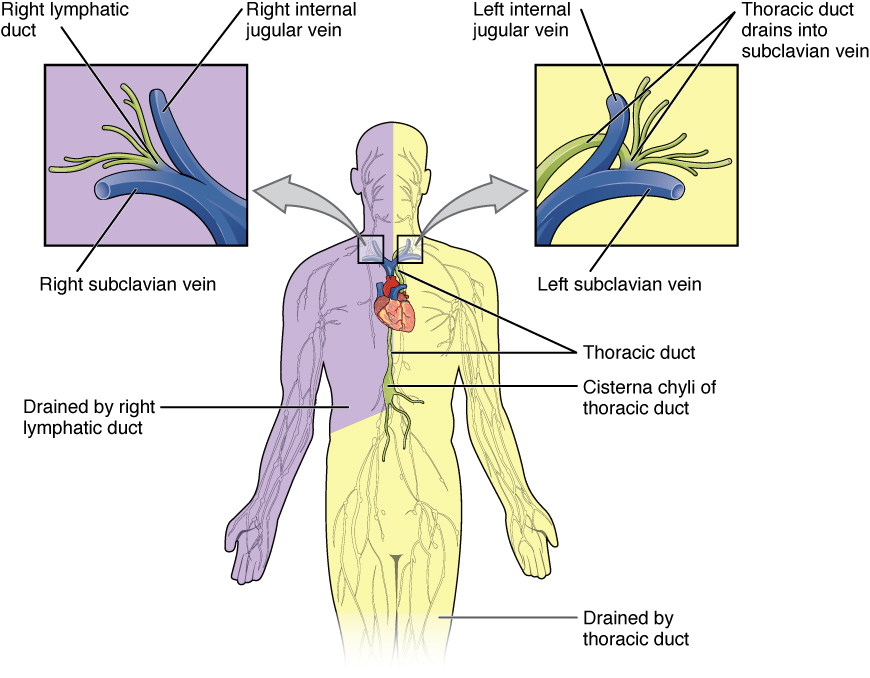
Right (purple inset) and left (yellow inset) venous angles

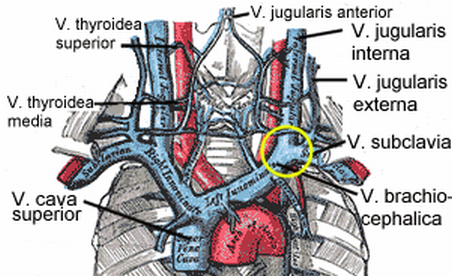
Yellow circle indicates the left venous angle

The venous angle (also known as Pirogoff's angle and in Latin as angulus venosus) is the junction where the ipsilateral internal jugular vein and subclavian vein unite to form the ipsilateral brachiocephalic vein. The thoracic duct drains at the left venous angle, and the right lymphatic duct drains at the right venous angle. At the venous angle, the carotid sheath and axillary sheath intermingle, forming a continuous neurovascular ensheathment.

The eponym is a reference to Nikolay Pirogov.
