= Solitary lymphatic nodule =

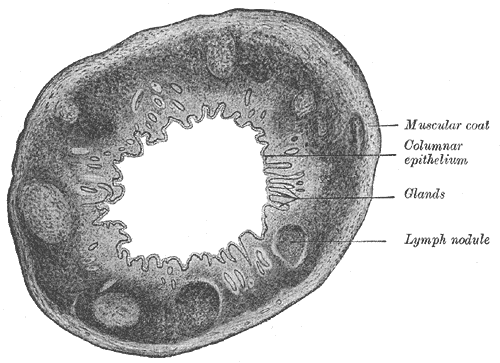
- Transverse section of human vermiform process. X 20. (Lymph nodule labeled at bottom right.)

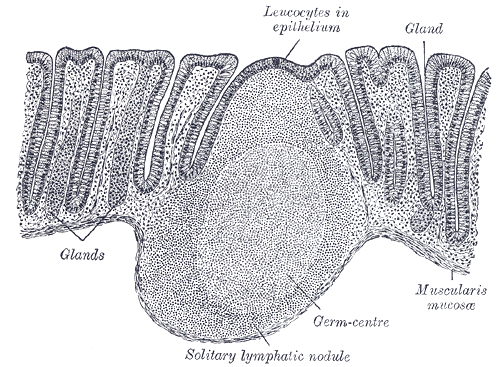
- Section of mucous membrane of human rectum. X 60. (Solitary lymphatic nodule labeled at bottom center.)

Details

Identifiers
- Latin: Noduli lymphoidei solitarii
- TA98: A05.6.01.013
- FMA: 76465

Solitary lymphatic nodules (or solitary lymphatic follicles) are structures found in the small intestine and large intestine.

== Small intestine ==
The solitary lymphatic nodules are found scattered throughout the mucous membrane of the small intestine, but are most numerous in the lower part of the ileum.

Their free surfaces are covered with rudimentary villi, except at the summits, and each gland is surrounded by the openings of the intestinal glands.

Each consists of a dense interlacing retiform tissue closely packed with lymph-corpuscles, and permeated with an abundant capillary network.

The interspaces of the retiform tissue are continuous with larger lymph spaces which surround the gland, through which they communicate with the lacteal system.

They are situated partly in the submucous tissue, partly in the mucous membrane, where they form slight projections of its epithelial layer.

== Large intestine ==
The solitary lymphatic nodules of the large intestine are most abundant in the cecum and vermiform process, but are irregularly scattered also over the rest of the intestine.

They are similar to those of the small intestine.

== See also ==
- Peyer's patch
