= Lymph duct =

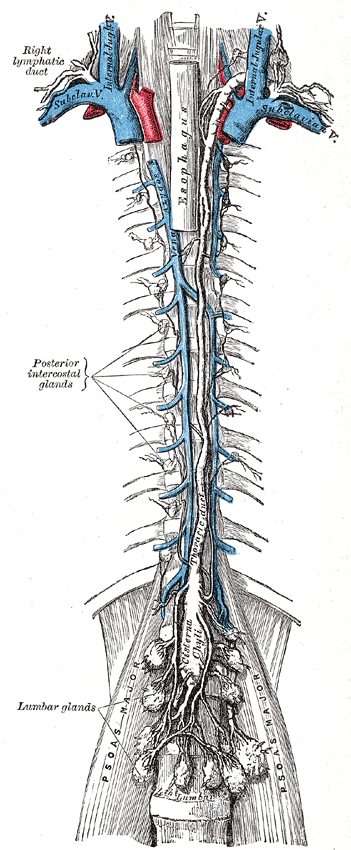
- The thoracic and right lymphatic duct

Details
- System: Lymphatic system
- Drains to: Subclavian veins

Identifiers
- Latin: ductus lymphaticus

A lymph duct (or lymphatic duct) is a great lymphatic vessel that empties lymph into one of the subclavian veins. There are two lymph ducts in the human body—the right lymphatic duct and the thoracic duct. The right lymphatic duct drains lymph from the right upper limb, right side of thorax and right halves of head and neck. The thoracic duct drains lymph into the circulatory system at the left brachiocephalic vein between the left subclavian and left internal jugular veins.

== See also ==
- Lymphatic system
- Right lymphatic duct
- Thoracic duct
