= Lymphangion =

Lymphatic vessels' part between two valves

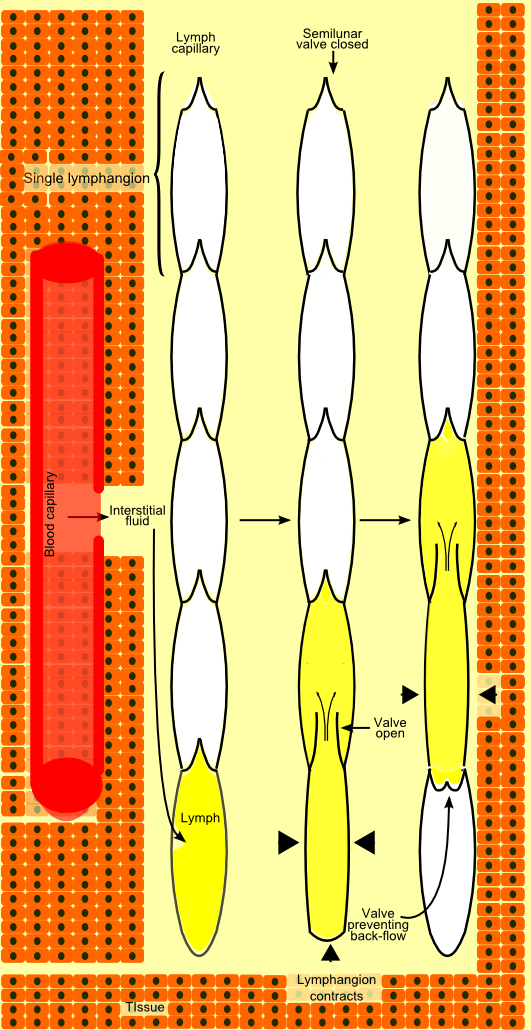
Propulsion of lymph from one lymphangion to next

A lymphangion is the functional unit of a lymph vessel that lies between two semilunar (half moon-shaped) valves.

Lymph vessels are channels larger than the lymph capillaries that have thicker walls, valves in their lumen and smooth muscles in their walls, thus lymph vessel lymphangion is muscular and capable of contracting on its own. Additionally the lymph in it is propelled forward only because of force exerted on its walls from the exterior. Such forces include skeletal muscle contractions and arterial pulsations. Also, the inspiration during respiration provides a suction pressure within the lumen.

The semilunar valves are directed towards the flow of the lymph and open when the pressure in the first lymphangion is greater than the pressure in the next lymphangion. Pressure in the first lymphangion may increase because of smooth muscle contraction (in lymph vessel) or because of pressure on the walls from outside (in a capillary) result because of. Alternatively, pressure within the next lymphangion may decrease because of negative pressure as a result of inspiration. Once the lymph flows into the next lymphangion, it cannot return to the previous lymphangion, as the semilunar valves close tightly.

In conditions when the pressure in a lymphatic is sufficiently great, the valves may fail, and there can indeed be backward flow of lymph resulting in edema of the drained region. This may happen with blockage of lymph flow because of pathology in the draining lymph node or at some point in the vessel.
