= Lymphatic system =

Organ system in vertebrates complementary to the circulatory system

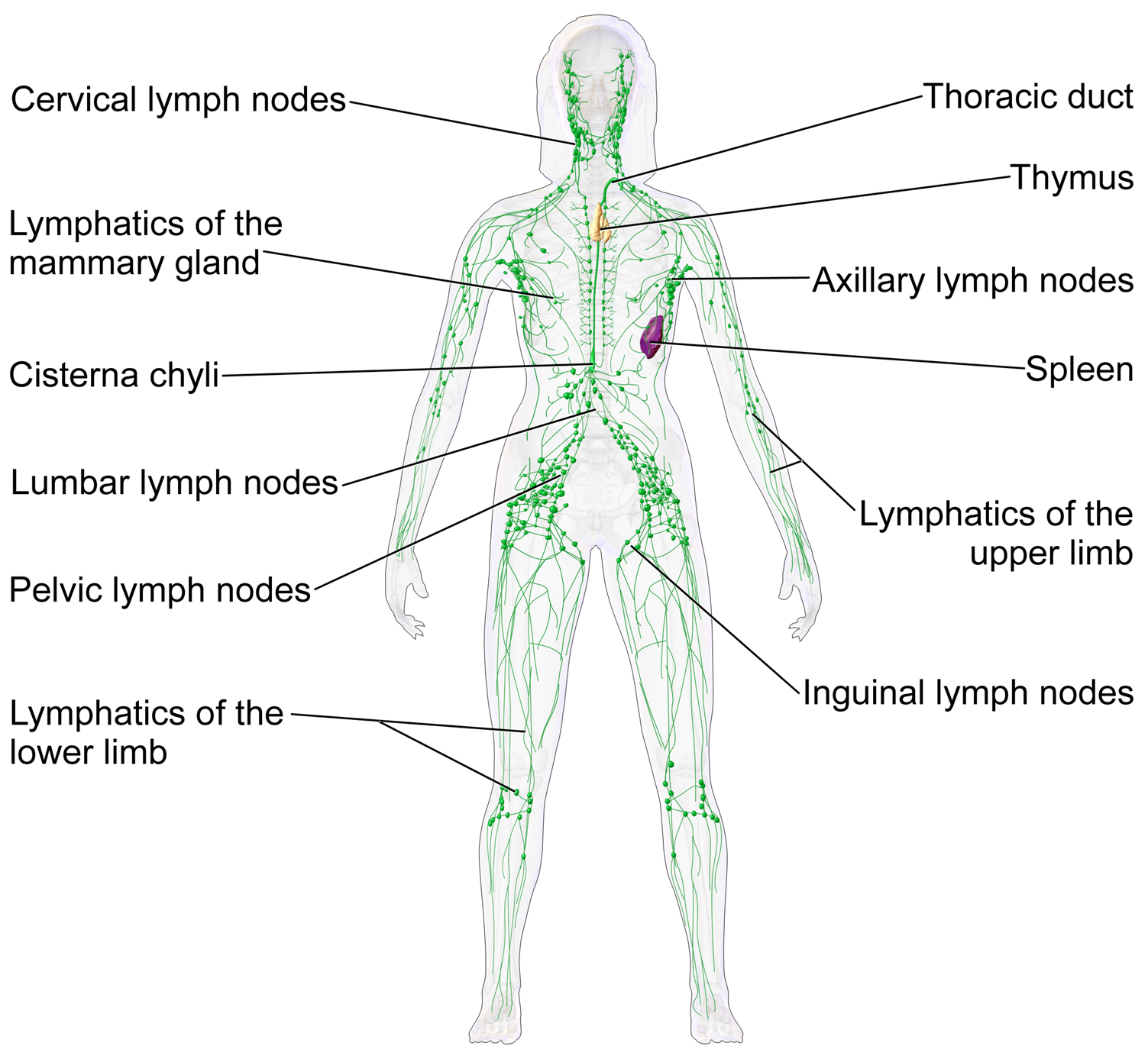
- Human lymphatic system

Details

Identifiers
- Latin: systema lymphoideum
- MeSH: D008208
- TA98: A13.0.00.000
- TA2: 5149
- FMA: 7162 74594, 7162

The lymphatic system, or lymphoid system, is a vital part of the immune system and complementary to the circulatory system. It consists of a large network of lymphatic vessels, lymph nodes, lymphoid organs, lymphatic tissue and lymph. The Latin word for lymph, lympha, refers to the deity of fresh water, "Lympha".

Unlike the circulatory system, which is a closed system, the lymphatic system is open. Lymph originates in the interstitial fluid that leaks from blood in the circulatory system into the tissues of the body. This fluid carries nutrients to the cells and collects waste products, bacteria, and damaged cells, before draining into the lymphatic vessels as lymph. The circulatory system processes an average of 20 litres (5.3 US gal) of blood per day through capillary filtration, which removes plasma from the blood. Roughly 17 litres (4.5 US gal) of the filtered blood is reabsorbed directly into the blood vessels, while the remaining 3 litres (0.79 US gal) are left in the interstitial fluid. The lymphatic system provides an accessory return route to the blood for this remainder.

The other main function is that of immune defense. Lymph is very similar to blood plasma, in that it contains waste products and cellular debris, together with bacteria and proteins. The cells of the lymph are mostly lymphocytes. Associated lymphoid organs are composed of lymphoid tissue, and are the sites either of lymphocyte production or of lymphocyte activation. These include the lymph nodes (where the highest lymphocyte concentration is found), the spleen, the thymus, and the tonsils. Lymphocytes are initially generated in the bone marrow. The lymphoid organs also contain other cell types, such as stromal cells for support. Lymphoid tissue is also associated with mucosas such as mucosa-associated lymphoid tissue (MALT).

These vessels carry lymph throughout the body, passing through numerous lymph nodes, which filter out unwanted materials such as bacteria and damaged cells. Lymph then passes into much larger lymph vessels known as lymph ducts. The right lymphatic duct drains the right side of the region, and the much larger left lymphatic duct, known as the thoracic duct, drains the left side of the body. The ducts empty into the subclavian veins to return to the bloodstream. Lymph is moved through the system by muscle contractions. In some vertebrates, a lymph heart is present that pumps the lymph to the veins.

The lymphatic system was first described in the 17th century independently by Olaus Rudbeck and Thomas Bartholin.

== Structure ==
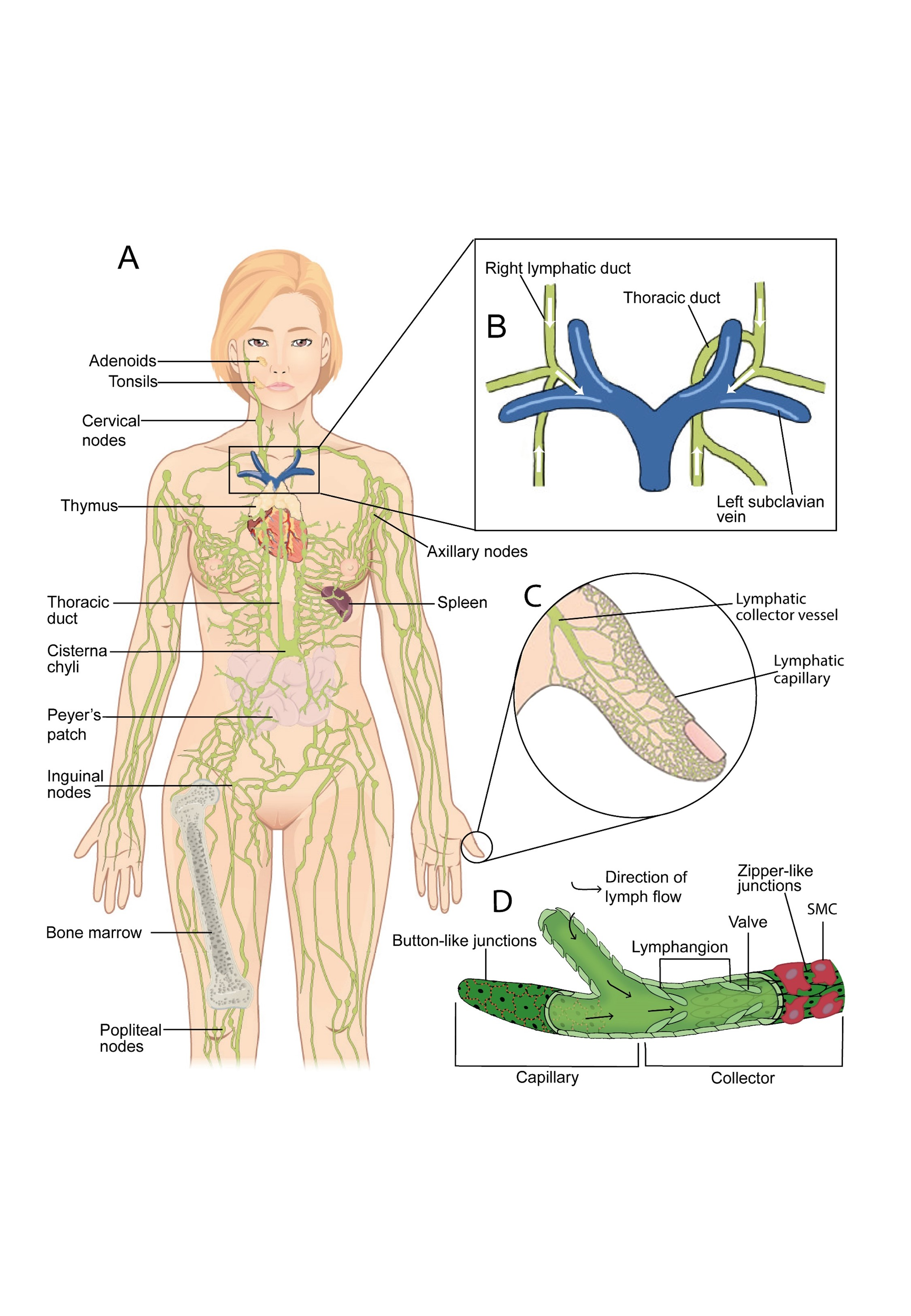
Anatomy of the lymphatic system showing primary and secondary lymphoid organs

The lymphatic system consists of a conducting network of lymphatic vessels, lymphoid organs, lymphoid tissues, and the circulating lymph.

=== Primary lymphoid organs ===
The primary (or central) lymphoid organs, including the thymus, bone marrow, fetal liver, and yolk sac, are responsible for generating lymphocytes from immature progenitor cells in the absence of antigens. The thymus and the bone marrow constitute the primary lymphoid organs involved in the production and early clonal selection of lymphocyte tissues.

Bird species' primary lymphoid organs include the bone marrow, thymus, bursa of Fabricius, and yolk sac.

==== Red bone marrow ====
Bone marrow- specifically red bone marrow- is responsible for both the creation of T cell precursors and the production and maturation of B cells, which are known as lymphocytes, important cell types of the immune system. From the red bone marrow, B cells immediately join the circulatory system and travel to secondary lymphoid organs in search of pathogens. T cells, on the other hand, travel from the bone marrow to the thymus, where they undergo a multistage process to develop immunocompetency. Within the thymic cortex, developing T cells rearrange their T-cell receptor (TCR) genes and are subjected to positive selection, which ensures that only T cells capable of recognizing self-major histocompatibility complex (MHC) molecules survive. Those that bind too weakly die off. Surviving T cells then move to the thymic medulla, where negative selection removes T cells that bind self-antigens with high affinity, preventing autoimmune disorders. Less than 5% of T cells pass both selection tests and reach maturity; these mature T cells then join B cells in search of pathogens.

==== Thymus ====
The thymus increases in size from birth in response to postnatal antigen stimulation. It is most active during the neonatal and pre-adolescent periods. The thymus is located between the inferior neck and the superior thorax. During adolescence, the thymus begins to atrophy and regress, with adipose tissue mostly replacing the thymic stroma. However, residual T cell lymphopoiesis continues throughout adulthood, providing some immune response. The thymus is where the T lymphocytes mature and become immunocompetent. The absence of the thymus (whether congenital or due to loss of the thymus gland) results in severe immunodeficiency and subsequent high susceptibility to infection. In most species, the thymus consists of lobules divided by septa. These are composed of epithelium. T cells mature from thymocytes, proliferate, and undergo a selection process in the thymic cortex before entering the medulla to interact with epithelial cells.

Research on bony fish showed a buildup of T cells in the thymus and spleen of lymphoid tissues in salmon and showed that there are not many T cells in non-lymphoid tissues.

The thymus provides an inductive environment for developing T cells from hematopoietic progenitor cells. In addition, thymic stromal cells facilitate the selection of a functional and self-tolerant T cell repertoire. Therefore, one of the most important roles of the thymus is the induction of central tolerance. However, the thymus is not where the infection is fought, as the T cells have yet to become immunocompetent.

=== Secondary lymphoid organs ===
The secondary (or peripheral) lymphoid organs, which include lymph nodes and the spleen, maintain mature naive lymphocytes and initiate an adaptive immune response. The secondary lymphoid organs are the sites of lymphocyte activation by antigens. Activation leads to clonal selection and affinity maturation. Mature lymphocytes recirculate between the blood and the secondary lymphoid organs until they encounter their specific antigen.

==== Spleen ====
The main functions of the spleen are:

1. to produce immune cells to fight antigens,
2. to remove particulate matter and aged blood cells, mainly red blood cells, and
3. to produce blood cells during fetal life.

The spleen synthesizes antibodies in its white pulp and removes antibody-coated bacteria and antibody-coated blood cells by way of blood and lymph node circulation. The white pulp of the spleen provides immune function due to the lymphocytes housed there. The spleen also consists of red pulp, which is responsible for getting rid of aged red blood cells and pathogens. This is carried out by macrophages present in the red pulp. A study published in 2009 using mice found that the spleen contains, in its reserve, half of the body's monocytes within the red pulp. These monocytes, upon moving to injured tissue (e.g., the heart), turn into dendritic cells and macrophages while promoting tissue healing. The spleen is a center of activity of the mononuclear phagocyte system. It can be considered analogous to a large lymph node, as its absence causes a predisposition to certain infections. Notably, the spleen is essential for a multitude of functions. The spleen removes pathogens and old erythrocytes from the blood (red pulp) and produces lymphocytes for immune response (white pulp). The spleen is also responsible for recycling some erythrocyte components and discarding others. For example, hemoglobin is broken down into amino acids, which are reused.

Research on bony fish has shown that a high concentration of T cells is found in the spleen's white pulp.

Like the thymus, the spleen has only efferent lymphatic vessels. Both the short gastric arteries and the splenic artery supply it with blood. The germinal centers are supplied by arterioles called penicilliary radicles.

In humans, until the fifth month of prenatal development, the spleen creates red blood cells; after birth, the bone marrow is solely responsible for hematopoiesis. As a major lymphoid organ and a central player in the reticuloendothelial system, the spleen retains the ability to produce lymphocytes. The spleen stores red blood cells and lymphocytes. It can store enough blood cells to help in an emergency. During acute blood loss, the spleen contracts to release stored erythrocytes, helping to maintain blood volume and oxygen delivery temporarily. Up to 25% of lymphocytes can be stored at any one time.

==== Lymph nodes ====
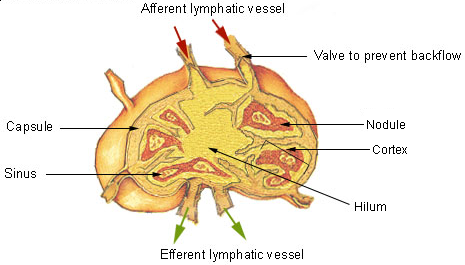
A lymph node showing afferent and efferent lymphatic vessels

Regional lymph nodes

A lymph node is an organized collection of lymphoid tissue through which the lymph passes on its way back to the blood. Lymph nodes are located at intervals along the lymphatic system. Several afferent lymph vessels bring in lymph, which percolates through the substance of the lymph node and is then drained out by an efferent lymph vessel. Of the nearly 800 lymph nodes in the human body, about 300 are located in the head and neck. Many are grouped in clusters in different regions, as in the underarm and abdominal areas. Lymph node clusters are commonly found at the proximal ends of limbs (e.g., groin or armpits) and in the neck, where lymph is collected from body regions likely to sustain pathogen contamination from injuries. Lymph nodes are particularly numerous in the mediastinum in the chest, neck, pelvis, axilla, groin (or inguinal region), and in association with the blood vessels of the intestines.

The substance of a lymph node consists of lymphoid follicles in an outer portion called the cortex. The inner portion of the node is called the medulla, which is surrounded by the cortex on all sides except for a portion known as the hilum. The hilum presents as a depression on the surface of the lymph node, causing the otherwise spherical lymph node to be bean-shaped or ovoid. The efferent lymph vessel directly emerges from the lymph node at the hilum. The arteries and veins supplying the lymph node with blood enter and exit through the hilum. The region of the lymph node called the paracortex immediately surrounds the medulla. Unlike the cortex, which has primarily immature T cells (or thymocytes), the paracortex has a mixture of immature and mature T cells. Lymphocytes enter the lymph nodes through specialised high endothelial venules found in the paracortex.

A lymph follicle is a dense collection of lymphocytes, the number, size, and configuration of which change in accordance with the functional state of the lymph node. For example, the follicles expand significantly when encountering a foreign antigen. The selection of B cells (also known as B lymphocytes) occurs in the germinal centre of the lymph nodes.

Secondary lymphoid tissue provides the environment for the foreign or altered native molecules (antigens) to interact with the lymphocytes. It is exemplified by the lymph nodes, and the lymphoid follicles in tonsils, Peyer's patches, spleen, adenoids, skin, etc. that are associated with the mucosa-associated lymphoid tissue (MALT).

In the gastrointestinal wall, the appendix has mucosa resembling that of the colon, but it is heavily infiltrated with lymphocytes here.

=== Tertiary lymphoid organs ===
Tertiary lymphoid organs (TLOs) are abnormal lymph node-like structures that form in peripheral tissues at sites of chronic inflammation, such as chronic infection, transplanted organs undergoing graft rejection, some cancers, and autoimmune and autoimmune-related diseases. TLOs are often characterized by CD20^{+} B cell zone, which is surrounded by CD3^{+} T cell zone, similar to the lymph follicles in secondary lymphoid organs (SLOs) and are regulated differently from the normal process whereby lymphoid tissues are formed during ontogeny, being dependent on cytokines and hematopoietic cells, but still drain interstitial fluid and transport lymphocytes in response to the same chemical messengers and gradients. Mature TLOs often have an active germinal center, surrounded by a network of follicular dendritic cells (FDCs). Although the specific composition of TLOs may vary, within the T cell compartment, the dominant subset of T cells is CD4^{+} T follicular helper (TFH) cells, but certain number of CD8^{+} cytotoxic T cells, CD4^{+} T helper 1 (TH1) cells, and regulatory T cells (Tregs) can also be found within the T cell zone. The B cell zone contains two main areas. The mantle is located at the periphery and composed of naive immunoglobulin D (IgD)^{+} B cells surrounding the germinal centre. The latter is defined by the presence of proliferating Ki67^{+}CD23^{+} B cells and a CD21^{+} FDC network, as observed in SLOs. TLOs typically contain far fewer lymphocytes, and assume an immune role only when challenged with antigens that result in inflammation. They achieve this by importing the lymphocytes from blood and lymph.

According to the composition and activation status of the cells within the lymphoid structures, at least three organizational levels of TLOs have been described. The formation of TLOs starts with the aggregating of lymphoid cells and occasional DCs, but FDCs are lacking at this stage. The next stage is immature TLOs, also known as primary follicle-like TLS, which have an increased number of T cells and B cells with distinct T cell and B cell zones and the formation of FDCs network, but without germinal centres. Finally, fully mature (also known as secondary follicle-like) TLOs often have active germinal centres and high endothelial venules (HEVs), demonstrating a functional capacity by promoting T cell and B cell activation and then leading to expansion of TLS through cell proliferation and recruitment. During TLS formation, T and B cells are separated into two distinct but adjacent zones, with some cells able to migrate from one to the other, which is a crucial step in developing an effective and coordinated immune response.

TLOs may play a key role in the immune response to cancer and serve as a prognostic marker for immunotherapy. TLOs have been reported to present in different cancer types such as melanoma, non-small-cell lung cancer and colorectal cancer (reviewed by Sautès-Fridman and colleagues in 2019), as well as glioma. TLOs are also seen as a read-out of treatment efficacy. For example, in patients with pancreatic ductal adenocarcinoma (PDAC), vaccination led to the formation of TLOs in responders. Within these patients, lymphocytes in TLOs displayed an activated phenotype, and in vitro experiments showed their capacity to perform effector functions. Patients with the presence of TLOs tend to have a better prognosis, even though certain cancer types showed an opposite effect. Besides, TLOs with an active germinal center seem to show a better prognosis than those with TLOs without a germinal center. The reason that these patients tend to live longer is that TLOs can promote an immune response against the tumors. TLOs may also enhance anti-tumor response when patients are treated with immunotherapy such as immune checkpoint blockade.

=== Other lymphoid tissue ===
Lymphoid tissue associated with the lymphatic system is concerned with immune functions in defending the body against infections and the spread of tumours. It consists of connective tissue formed of reticular fibers, with various types of leukocytes (white blood cells), mostly lymphocytes enmeshed in it, through which the lymph passes. Regions of the lymphoid tissue that are densely packed with lymphocytes are known as lymphoid follicles. Lymphoid tissue can either be structurally well organized as lymph nodes or may consist of loosely organized lymphoid follicles known as the mucosa-associated lymphoid tissue (MALT).

The central nervous system also has lymphatic vessels. The search for T cell gateways into and out of the meninges uncovered functional meningeal lymphatic vessels lining the dural sinuses, anatomically integrated into the membrane surrounding the brain.

=== Lymphatic vessels ===
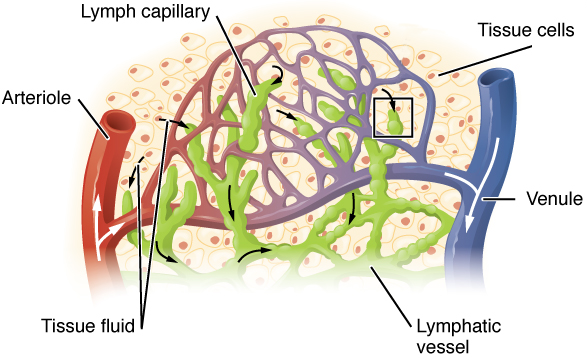
Lymph capillaries in the tissue spaces

The lymphatic vessels, also called lymph vessels, are thin-walled vessels that conduct lymph between different parts of the body. They include the tubular vessels of the lymph capillaries, and the larger collecting vessels – the right lymphatic duct and the thoracic duct (the left lymphatic duct). Lymph capillaries are primarily responsible for the absorption of interstitial fluid from the tissues. Lymph vessels propel the absorbed fluid forward into the larger collecting ducts, where it ultimately returns to the bloodstream via one of the subclavian veins.

The tissues of the lymphatic system are responsible for maintaining the balance of the body fluids. Its network of capillaries and collecting lymphatic vessels efficiently drain and transport extravasated fluid, along with proteins and antigens, back to the circulatory system. Numerous intraluminal valves in the vessels ensure a unidirectional lymph flow without reflux. Two valve systems, a primary and a secondary valve system, are used to achieve this unidirectional flow. The capillaries are blind-ended; the valves at the ends of capillaries use specialised junctions together with anchoring filaments to allow a unidirectional flow to the primary vessels. When interstitial fluid increases, it causes swelling that stretches collagen fibers anchored to adjacent connective tissue, opening the unidirectional valves at the ends of these capillaries and facilitating the entry and subsequent drainage of excess lymph fluid. The collecting lymphatics, however, propel the lymph by the combined actions of the intraluminal valves and lymphatic muscle cells.

== Development ==
Lymphatic tissues begin to develop by the end of the fifth week of embryonic development. Lymphatic vessels develop from lymph sacs that arise from developing veins, which are derived from mesoderm. The first lymph sacs to appear are the paired jugular lymph sacs at the junction of the internal jugular and subclavian veins. From the jugular lymph sacs, lymphatic capillary plexuses spread to the thorax, upper limbs, neck, and head. Some of the plexuses enlarge and form lymphatic vessels in their respective regions. Each jugular lymph sac retains at least one connection with its jugular vein, the left one developing into the superior portion of the thoracic duct. The spleen develops from mesenchymal cells between layers of the dorsal mesentery of the stomach. The thymus arises as an outgrowth of the third pharyngeal pouch.

== Function ==
The lymphatic system has multiple interrelated functions:

- It is responsible for the removal of interstitial fluid from tissues
- It absorbs and transports fatty acids and fats as chyle from the digestive system
- It transports white blood cells to and from the lymph nodes into the bones
- The lymph transports antigen-presenting cells, such as dendritic cells, to the lymph nodes where an immune response is stimulated.

=== Fat absorption ===
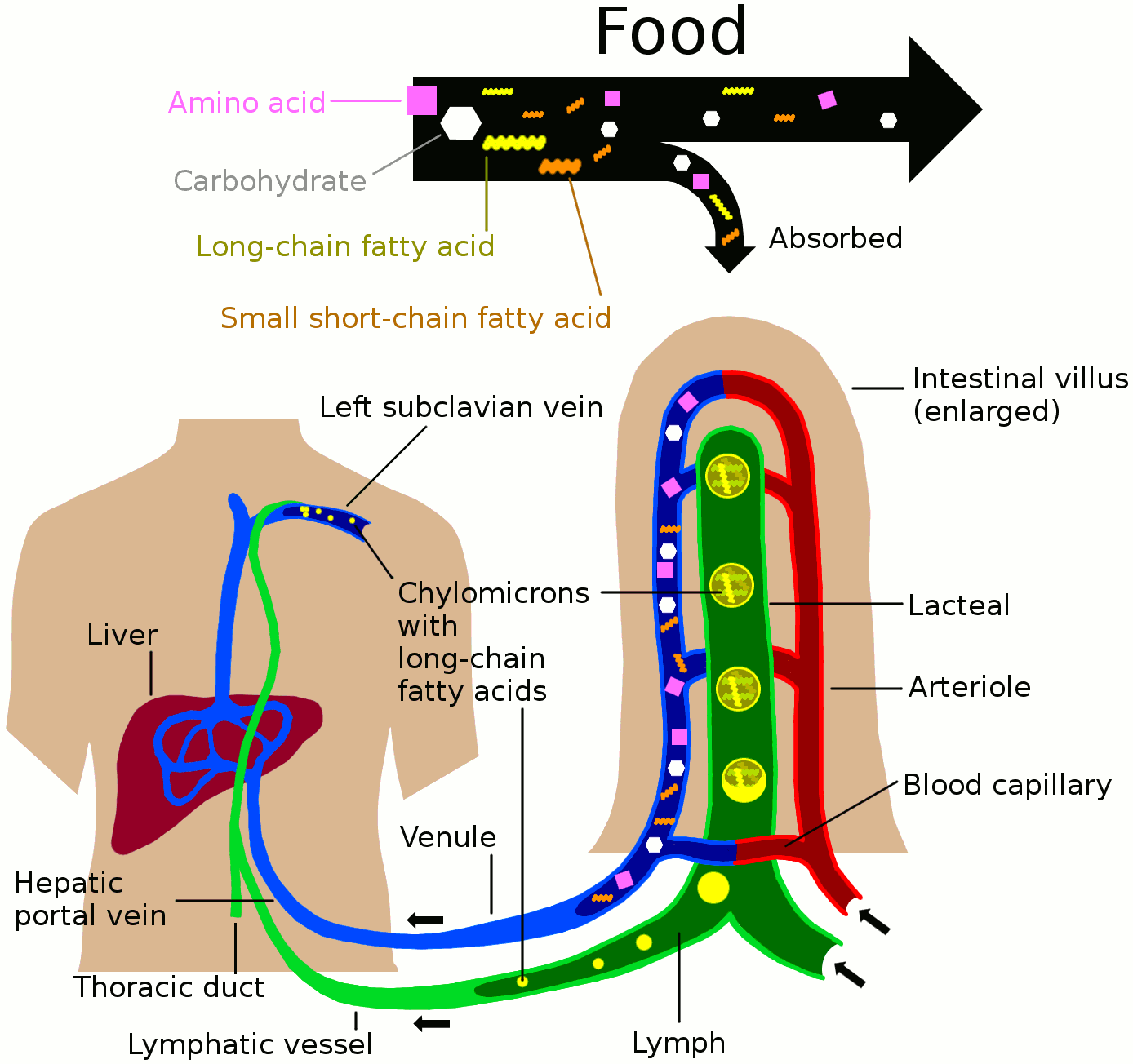
Nutrients in food are absorbed via intestinal villi (greatly enlarged in the picture) to blood and lymph. Long-chain fatty acids (and other lipids with similar fat solubility, like some medicines) are absorbed into the lymph and enveloped inside chylomicrons for transport. They move via the thoracic duct of the lymphatic system and finally enter the blood via the left subclavian vein, thus bypassing the liver's first-pass metabolism completely.

Lymph vessels called lacteals are at the beginning of the gastrointestinal tract, predominantly in the small intestine. While most other nutrients absorbed by the small intestine are passed on to the portal venous system to drain via the portal vein into the liver for processing, fats (lipids) are passed on to the lymphatic system to be transported to the blood circulation via the thoracic duct. (There are exceptions, for example, medium-chain triglycerides are fatty acid esters of glycerol that passively diffuse from the GI tract to the portal system.) The enriched lymph originating in the lymphatics of the small intestine is called chyle. The nutrients that are released into the circulatory system are processed by the liver, having passed through the systemic circulation.

=== Immune function ===
The lymphatic system plays a major role in the body's immune system, as the primary site for cells relating to adaptive immune system, including T-cells and B-cells.

In addition to carrying waste products, cellular debris, nutrients, and proteins, the lymph may also contain antigens that can interact with naive lymphocytes in the lymph nodes. These cells in the lymphatic system react to antigens presented or found by the cells directly or by other dendritic cells.

When an antigen is recognized, an immunological cascade begins involving the activation and recruitment of more and more cells, the production of antibodies and cytokines, and the recruitment of other immunological cells such as macrophages.

== Clinical significance ==
The study of lymphatic drainage of various organs is important in the diagnosis, prognosis, and treatment of cancer. The lymphatic system, because of its closeness to many tissues of the body, is responsible for carrying cancerous cells between the various parts of the body in a process called metastasis. The intervening lymph nodes can trap the cancer cells. If they are not successful in destroying the cancer cells, the nodes may become sites of secondary tumours.

The lymphatic system (LS) comprises lymphoid organs and a network of vessels responsible for transporting interstitial fluid, antigens, lipids, cholesterol, immune cells, and other materials throughout the body. Dysfunction or abnormal development of the LS has been linked to numerous diseases, making it critical for fluid balance, immune cell trafficking, and inflammation control. Recent advancements, including single-cell technologies, clinical imaging, and biomarker discovery, have improved the ability to study and understand the LS, providing potential pathways for disease prevention and treatment. Studies have shown that the lymphatic system also plays a role in modulating immune responses, with dysfunction linked to chronic inflammatory and autoimmune conditions, as well as cancer progression.

=== Enlarged lymph nodes ===
Lymphadenopathy refers to one or more enlarged lymph nodes. Small groups or individually enlarged lymph nodes are generally reactive in response to infection or inflammation. This is called local lymphadenopathy. When many lymph nodes in different areas of the body are involved, this is called generalised lymphadenopathy. Generalised lymphadenopathy may be caused by infections such as infectious mononucleosis, tuberculosis and HIV, connective tissue diseases such as SLE and rheumatoid arthritis, and cancers, including both cancers of tissue within lymph nodes, discussed below, and metastasis of cancerous cells from other parts of the body, that have arrived via the lymphatic system.

=== Lymphedema ===
Lymphedema is the swelling caused by the accumulation of lymph, which may occur if the lymphatic system is damaged or has malformations. It usually affects limbs, though the face, neck, and abdomen may also be affected. In an extreme state, called elephantiasis, the edema progresses to the extent that the skin becomes thick with an appearance similar to the skin on elephant limbs.

Causes are unknown in most cases, but sometimes there is a previous history of severe infection, usually caused by a parasitic disease, such as lymphatic filariasis.

Lymphangiomatosis is a disease involving multiple cysts or lesions formed from lymphatic vessels.

Lymphedema can also occur after surgical removal of lymph nodes in the armpit (causing the arm to swell due to poor lymphatic drainage) or groin (causing swelling of the leg). Conventional treatment is by manual lymphatic drainage and compression garments. Two drugs for the treatment of lymphedema are in clinical trials: Lymfactin and Ubenimex/Bestatin. There is no evidence to suggest that the effects of manual lymphatic drainage are permanent.

=== Cancer ===
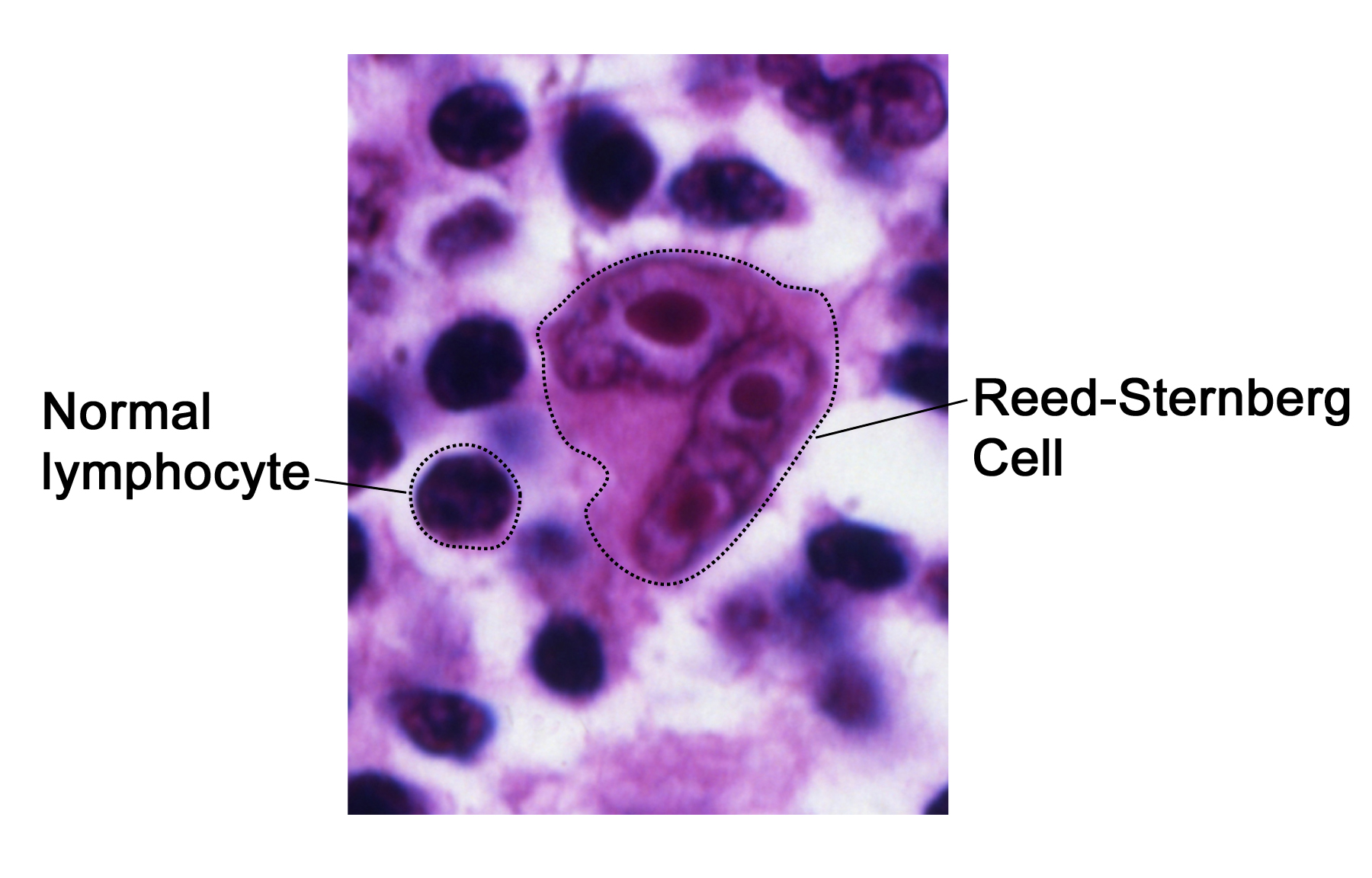
Reed–Sternberg cells

Cancer of the lymphatic system can be primary or secondary. Lymphoma refers to cancer that arises from lymphatic tissue. Lymphoid leukaemias and lymphomas are now considered to be tumours of the same type of cell lineage. They are called "leukaemia" when in the blood or marrow and "lymphoma" when in lymphatic tissue. They are grouped together under the name "lymphoid malignancy".

Lymphoma is generally considered as either Hodgkin lymphoma or non-Hodgkin lymphoma. A particular type of microscopic cell, known as a Reed–Sternberg cell, characterises Hodgkin lymphoma. It is associated with past infection with the Epstein–Barr virus and generally causes a painless "rubbery" lymphadenopathy. It is staged, using Ann Arbor staging. Chemotherapy generally involves the ABVD and may also involve radiotherapy. Non-Hodgkin lymphoma is a cancer characterised by increased proliferation of B-cells or T-cells, and generally occurs in an older age group than Hodgkin lymphoma. It is treated according to whether it is high-grade or low-grade, and carries a poorer prognosis than Hodgkin lymphoma.

Lymphangiosarcoma is a malignant soft tissue tumour, whereas lymphangioma is a benign tumour occurring frequently in association with Turner syndrome. Lymphangioleiomyomatosis is a benign tumour of the smooth muscles of the lymphatics that occurs in the lungs.

Lymphoid leukaemia is another form of cancer in which the host is devoid of different lymphatic cells.

=== Other ===
- Castleman's disease
- Chylothorax
- Kawasaki disease
- Kikuchi disease
- Lipedema
- Lymphangiomatosis
- Lymphangitis
- Lymphatic filariasis
- Lymphocytic choriomeningitis
- Solitary lymphatic nodule

== History ==
Hippocrates, in the 5th century BC, was one of the first people to mention the lymphatic system. In his work On Joints, he briefly mentioned the lymph nodes in one sentence. Rufus of Ephesus, a Roman physician, identified the axillary, inguinal and mesenteric lymph nodes as well as the thymus during the 1st to 2nd century AD. The first mention of lymphatic vessels was in the 3rd century BC by Herophilos, a Greek anatomist living in Alexandria, who incorrectly concluded that the "absorptive veins of the lymphatics," by which he meant the lacteals (lymph vessels of the intestines), drained into the hepatic portal veins, and thus into the liver. The findings of Ruphus and Herophilos were further propagated by the Greek physician Galen, who described the lacteals and mesenteric lymph nodes which he observed in his dissection of apes and pigs in the 2nd century AD.

In the mid-16th century, Gabriele Falloppio (discoverer of the fallopian tubes), described what is now known as the lacteals as "coursing over the intestines full of yellow matter." In about 1563 Bartolomeo Eustachi, a professor of anatomy, described the thoracic duct in horses as vena alba thoracis. The next breakthrough came when, in 1622, a physician, Gaspare Aselli, identified lymphatic vessels of the intestines in dogs and termed them venae albae et lacteae, which are now known as simply the lacteals. The lacteals were termed the fourth kind of vessels (the other three being the artery, vein, and nerve, which was then believed to be a type of vessel), disproving Galen's assertion that the veins carried chyle. But, he still believed that the lacteals carried the chyle to the liver (as taught by Galen). He also identified the thoracic duct but failed to notice its connection with the lacteals. This connection was established by Jean Pecquet in 1651, who found a white fluid mixing with blood in a dog's heart. He suspected that the fluid was chyle as its flow increased when abdominal pressure was applied. He traced this fluid to the thoracic duct, which he then followed to a chyle-filled sac he called the chyli receptaculum, which is now known as the cisternae chyli; further investigations led him to find that lacteals' contents enter the venous system via the thoracic duct. Thus, it was proven convincingly that the lacteals did not terminate in the liver, thus disproving Galen's second idea: that the chyle flowed to the liver. Johann Veslingius drew the earliest sketches of the lacteals in humans in 1641.

The idea that blood recirculates through the body rather than being produced anew by the liver and the heart was first accepted as a result of the works of William Harvey—a work he published in 1628. In 1652, Olaus Rudbeck (1630–1702) discovered certain transparent vessels in the liver that contained clear fluid (and not white), and thus named them hepatico-aqueous vessels. He also learned that they emptied into the thoracic duct and that they had valves. He announced his findings in the court of Queen Christina of Sweden. However, he did not publish his findings for a year, and in the interim similar findings were published by Thomas Bartholin, who additionally published that such vessels are present everywhere in the body, not just in the liver. He is also the one who named them "lymphatic vessels." This had resulted in a bitter dispute between one of Bartholin's pupils, Martin Bogdan, and Rudbeck, whom he accused of plagiarism.

Galen's ideas prevailed in medicine until the 17th century. It was thought that blood was produced by the liver from chyle contaminated with ailments by the intestine and stomach, to which other organs added various spirits, and that all the other organs of the body consumed this blood. This theory required that the blood be consumed and produced many times over. Even in the 17th century, his ideas were defended by some physicians.

Alexander Monro, of the University of Edinburgh Medical School, was the first to describe the function of the lymphatic system in detail.

UVA School of Medicine researchers Jonathan Kipnis and Antoine Louveau discovered previously unknown vessels connecting the human brain directly to the lymphatic system. The discovery "redrew the map" of the lymphatic system, rewrote medical textbooks, and struck down long-held beliefs about how the immune system functions in the brain. The discovery may help greatly in combating neurological diseases from multiple sclerosis to Alzheimer's disease.

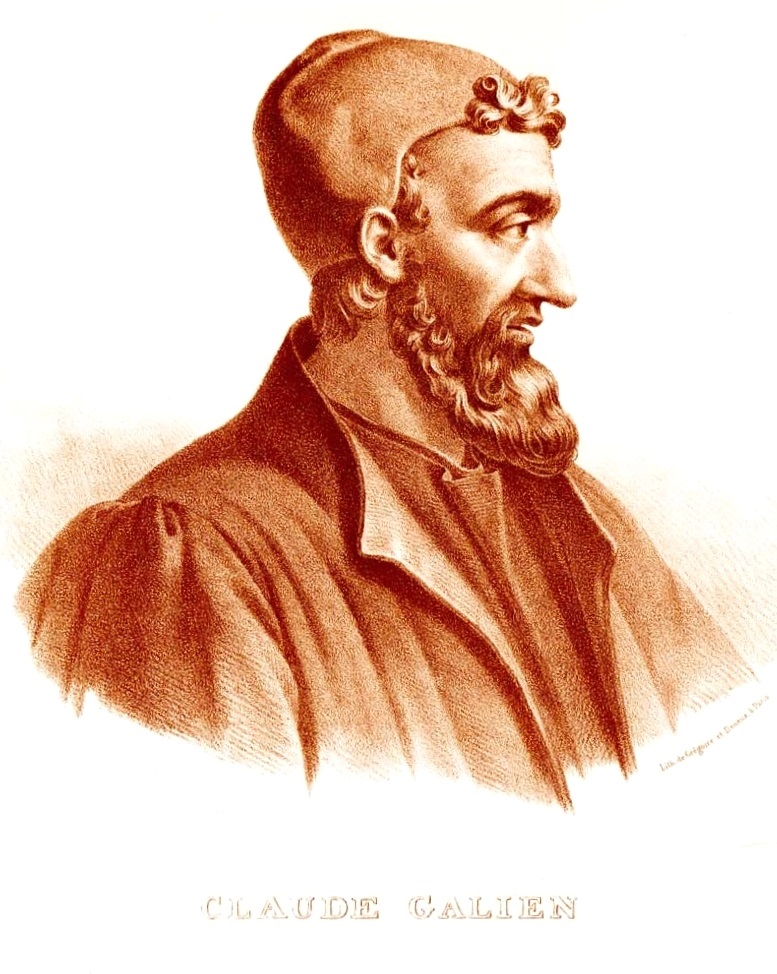
"Claude Galien". Lithograph by Pierre Roche Vigneron. (Paris: Lith de Gregoire et Deneux, c. 1865)

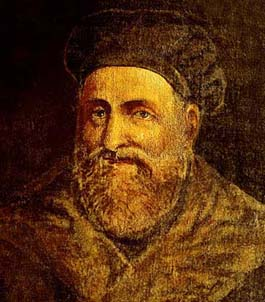
Gabriele Falloppio

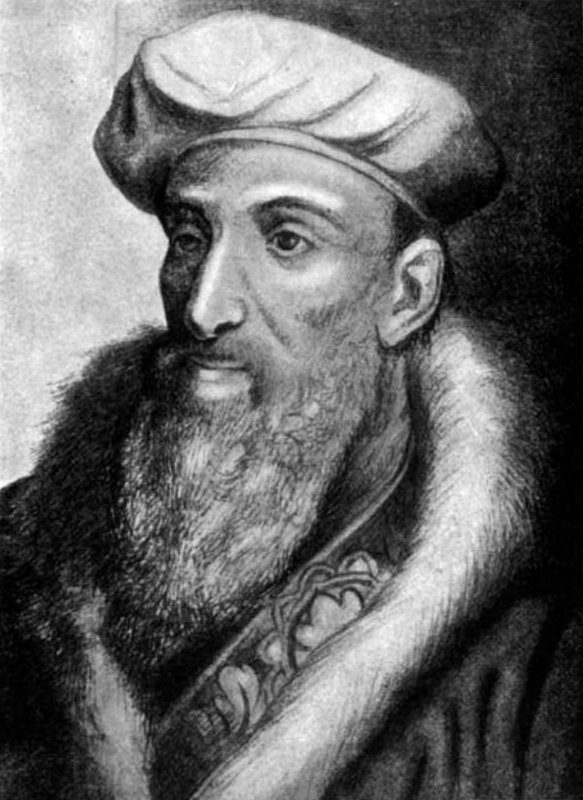
Portrait of Eustachius

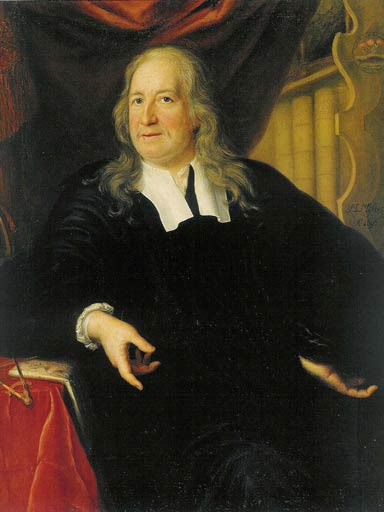
Olaus Rudbeck in 1696.

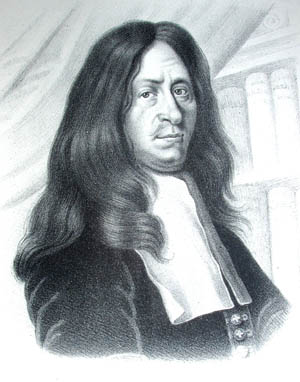
Thomas Bartholin

=== Etymology ===
Lymph originates in the Classical Latin word lympha "water", which is also the source of the English word limpid. The spelling with y and ph was influenced by folk etymology with Greek νύμϕη (nýmphē) "nymph".

The adjective used for the lymph-transporting system is lymphatic. The adjective used for the tissues where lymphocytes are formed is lymphoid. Lymphatic comes from the Latin word lymphaticus, meaning "connected to water."

== See also ==
- List of lymphatic nodes of the human body
- American Society of Lymphology
- Glymphatic system and Meningeal lymphatic vessels - equivalent for the central nervous system
- Innate lymphoid cells
- Lymphangiogenesis
- Lymphangion
- Mononuclear phagocyte system
- Waldemar Olszewski – discovered fundamental processes in human tissues connected with function of the lymphatic system
- Trogocytosis
