= Right lymphatic duct =

Lymphatic vessel

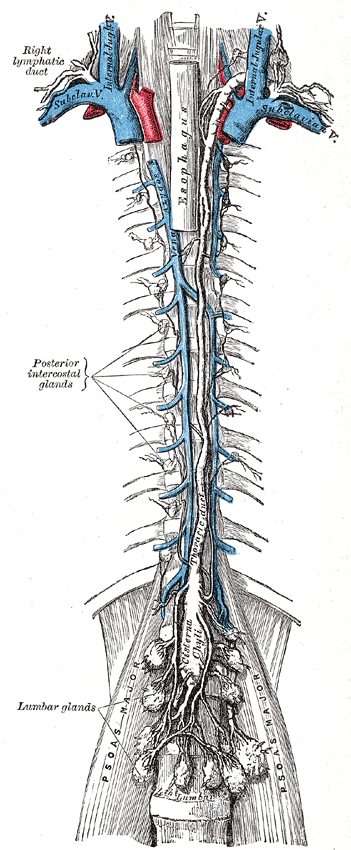
- The thoracic and right lymphatic ducts. (Right lymphatic duct is labeled at upper left.)

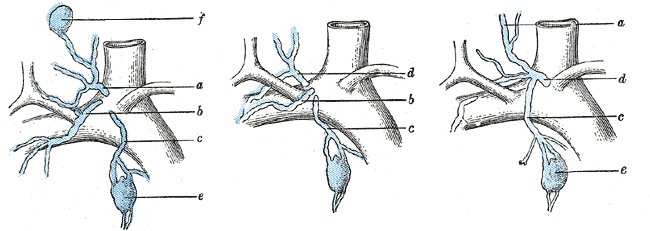
- Terminal collecting trunks of right side. a. Jugular trunk. b. Subclavian trunk. c. Bronchomediastinal trunk. d. Right lymphatic trunk. e. Gland of internal mammary chain. f. Gland of deep cervical chain.

Details
- System: Lymphatic system
- Source: Right jugular trunk
- Drains to: Internal jugular vein

Identifiers
- Latin: ductus lymphaticus dexter
- TA98: A12.4.01.006
- TA2: 5132
- FMA: 5832

The right lymphatic duct is an important lymphatic vessel that drains the right upper quadrant of the human body. It forms various combinations with the right subclavian vein and right internal jugular vein.

== Structure ==
The right lymphatic duct courses along the medial border of the anterior scalene at the root of the neck. The right lymphatic duct forms various combinations with the right subclavian vein and right internal jugular vein. It is approximately 1.25 cm long.

=== Variations ===
A right lymphatic duct that enters directly into the junction of the internal jugular and subclavian veins is uncommon.

== Function ==
Diagram showing parts of the body that drain into the right lymphatic duct.

The right duct drains lymph fluid from:

- the upper right section of the trunk, (right thoracic cavity, via the right bronchomediastinal trunk)
- the right arm (via the right subclavian trunk)
- and right side of the head and neck (via the right jugular trunk)
- also, in some individuals, the lower lobe of the left lung.

All other sections of the human body are drained by the thoracic duct.

== Clinical significance ==
Along with the thoracic duct, the right lymphatic duct is one of the lymphatic structures most likely to be ruptured in the thorax. This can cause chylothorax.

== History ==
The discovery of this structure has been credited to Niels Stensen.

== Additional images ==
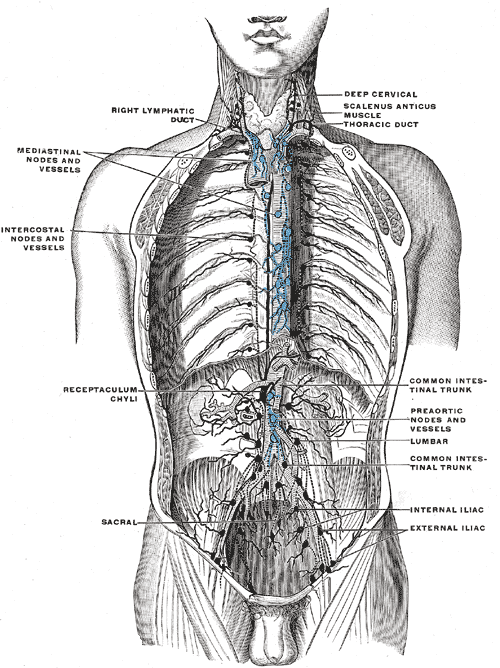
Deep lymph nodes and vessels of the thorax and abdomen (diagrammatic).
