= Subclavian vein =

Blood vessel that drains the arm

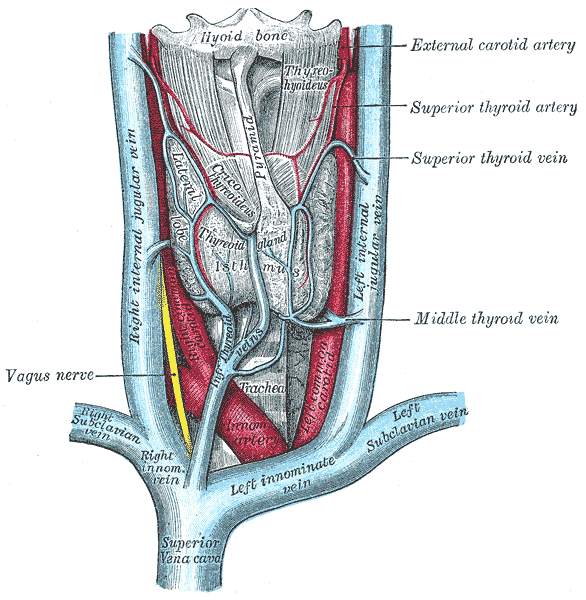
- The thyroid gland and its relations. (Right subclavian vein visible at bottom left, left subclavian vein visible at bottom right.)

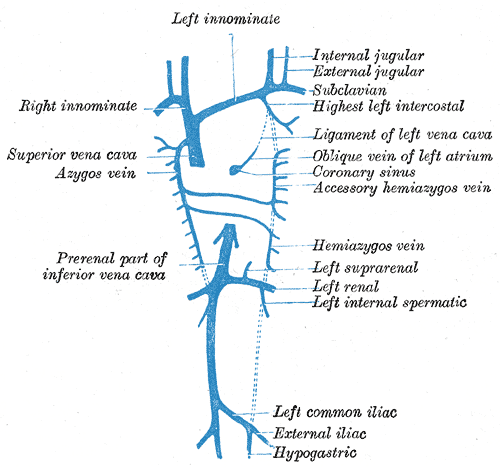
- Diagram showing completion of development of the parietal veins. (Subclavian vein labeled at right, third from top.)

Details
- Drains from: Upper extremity
- Source: Axillary vein, external jugular vein
- Drains to: Brachiocephalic vein
- Artery: Subclavian artery

Identifiers
- Latin: vena subclavia
- MeSH: D013350
- TA98: A12.3.08.002
- TA2: 4953
- FMA: 4725

The subclavian vein is a paired large vein, one on either side of the body, that is responsible for draining blood from the upper extremities, allowing this blood to return to the heart. The left subclavian vein plays a key role in the absorption of lipids, by allowing products that have been carried by lymph in the thoracic duct to enter the bloodstream. The diameter of the subclavian veins is approximately 1–2 cm, depending on the individual.

== Structure ==
Each subclavian vein is a continuation of the axillary vein and runs from the outer border of the first rib to the medial border of anterior scalene muscle. From here it joins with the internal jugular vein to form the brachiocephalic vein (also known as "innominate vein"). The angle of union is termed the venous angle.

The subclavian vein follows the subclavian artery and is separated from the subclavian artery by the insertion of anterior scalene. Thus, the subclavian vein lies anterior to the anterior scalene while the subclavian artery lies posterior to the anterior scalene (and anterior to the middle scalene).

== Function ==
The thoracic duct drains into the left subclavian vein, near its junction with the left internal jugular vein. It carries lymph (water and solutes) from the lymphatic system, as well as chylomicrons or chyle, formed in the intestines from dietary fat and lipids, allowing these to enter the bloodstream; the products of fats and lipids can then be carried by the bloodstream to the hepatic portal vein, and then finally to the liver. Consequently, the left subclavian vein plays a key role in the absorption of these fats and lipids.

The right lymphatic duct drains its lymph into the junction of the right internal jugular vein, and the right subclavian vein.

== Clinical relevance ==
=== Central venous lines ===
As the subclavian vein is large, central and relatively superficial, the right subclavian vein is often used to place central venous lines. It is less commonly used than other approaches, such as the right internal jugular vein, due to the risk of pneumothorax, haemothorax, and puncture of the accompanying subclavian artery.

=== Thoracic outlet syndrome ===
The subclavian vein may be blocked in thoracic outlet syndrome. This can lead to arm swelling, pain, and cyanosis. The cause of the thoracic outlet syndrome, whether a thrombus or external pressure, must be removed immediately.

== Etymology ==
Sub (below), and clavian (pertaining to the clavicle).

== Disorders ==
Paget–Schroetter disease includes the thrombosis of the subclavian veins, in this case usually caused by exercise-induced strains.

== See also ==
- Subclavian artery

== Additional images ==
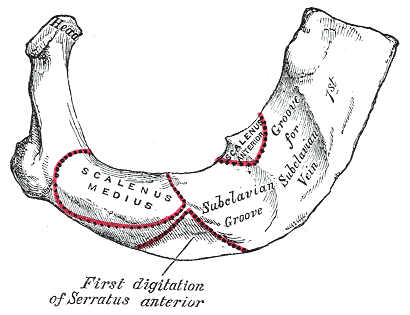
Peculiar ribs.

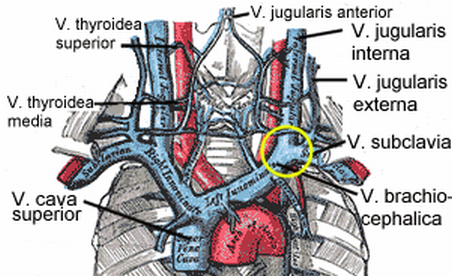
The venæ cavæ and azygos veins, with their tributaries.

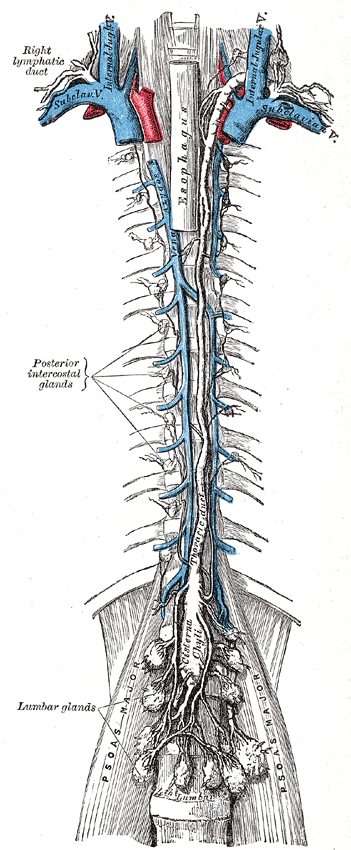
The thoracic and right lymphatic ducts.

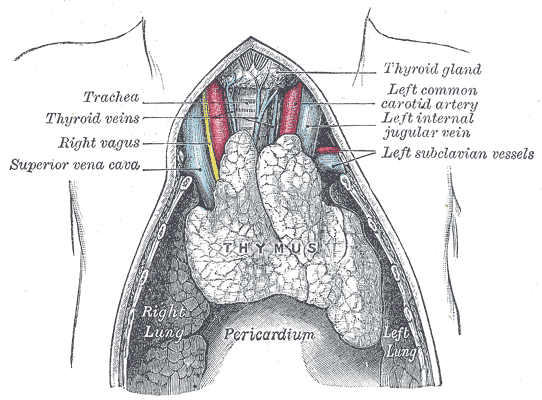
The thymus of a full-term infant, exposed in situ.

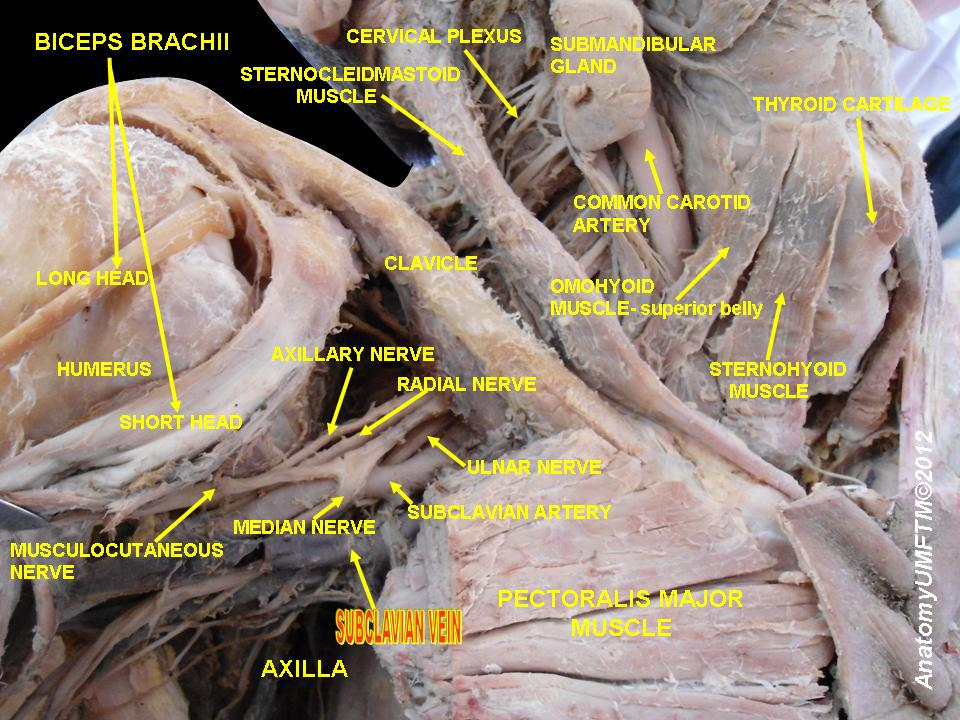
Subclavian vein

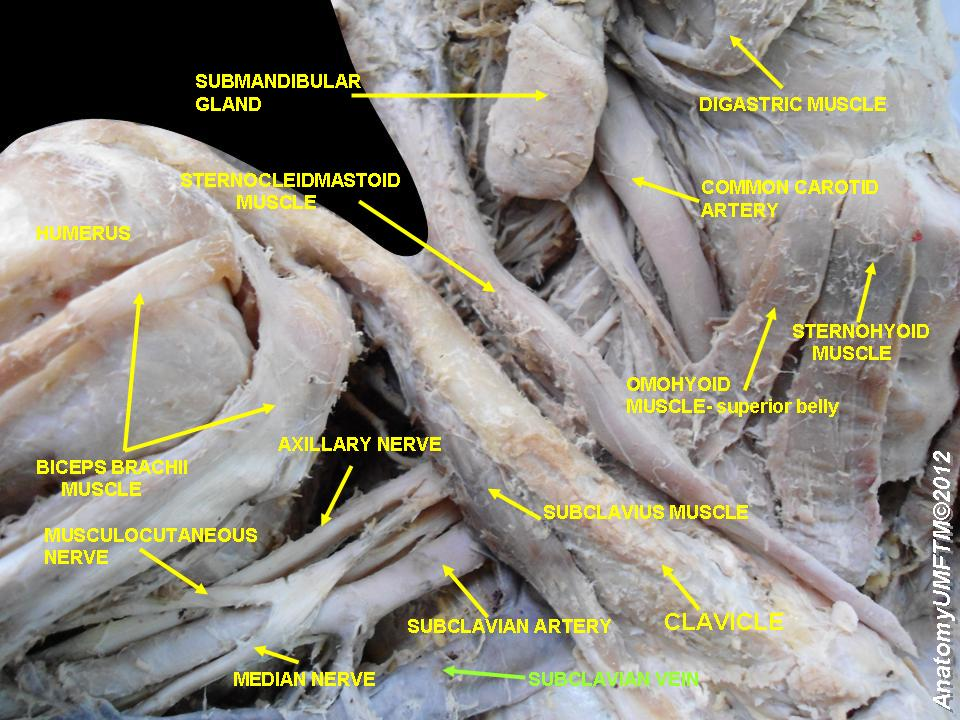
Subclavian vein - right view

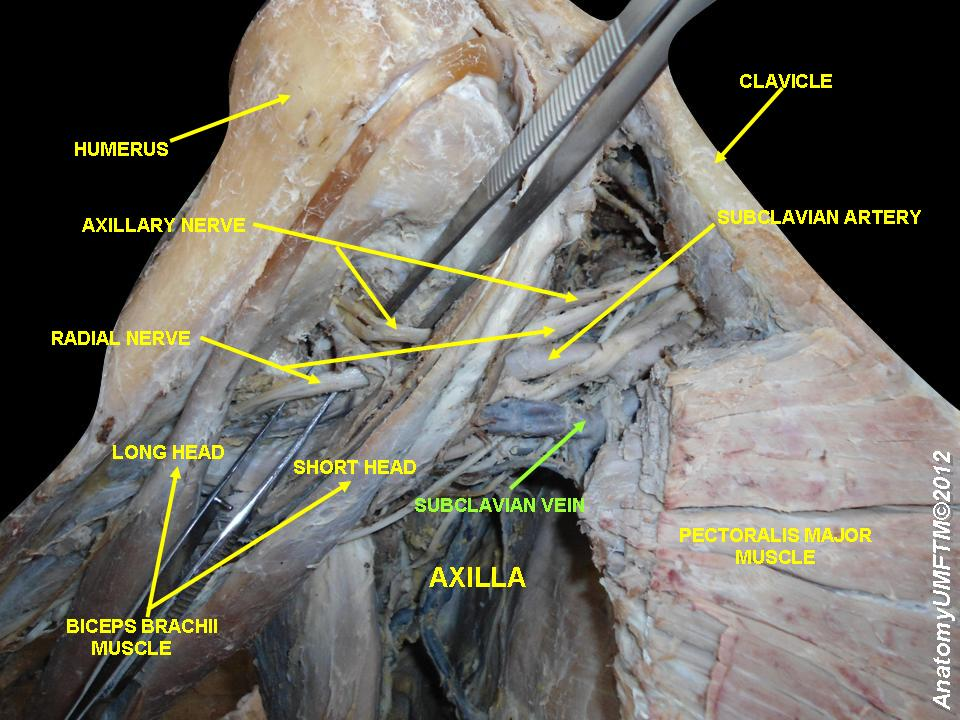
Subclavian vein

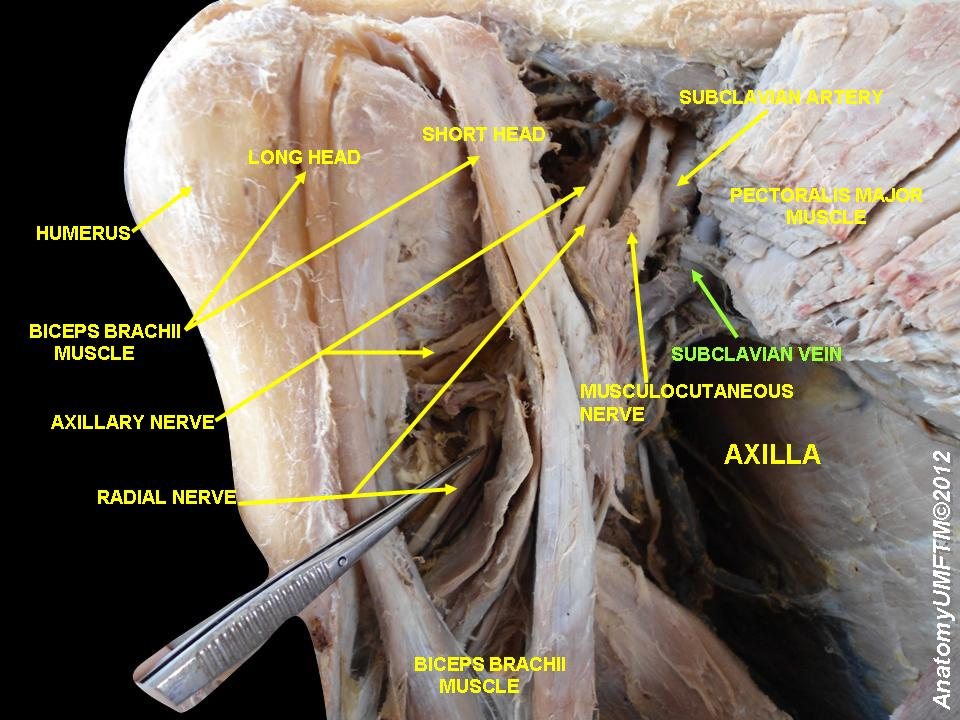
Subclavian vein
