= Deep parotid lymph nodes =

Lymph nodes found below the parotid gland

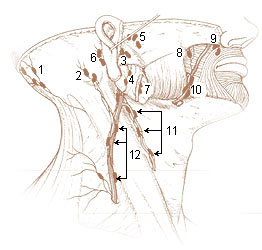
- Lymph nodes of the head and neck (4. deep parotid)

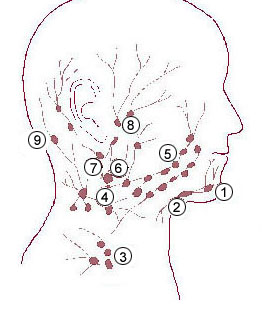
- 1: Submental lymph nodes 2: Submandibular lymph nodes 3: Supraclavicular lymph nodes 4: Retropharyngeal lymph nodes 5: Buccinator lymph node 6: Superficial cervical lymph nodes 7: Jugular lymph nodes 8: Parotid lymph nodes 9: Retroauricular lymph nodes and occipital lymph nodes

Details
- System: Lymphatic system

Identifiers
- Latin: nodi lymphoidei parotidei profundi

The deep parotid lymph nodes are lymph nodes found below the parotid gland.

The afferents of the subparotid glands drain the nasal part of the pharynx and the posterior parts of the nasal cavities.

Their efferents pass to the superior deep cervical glands.

== Additional images ==
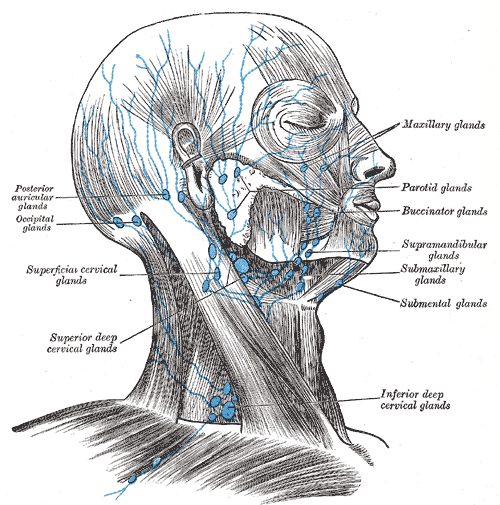
Superficial lymph glands and lymphatic vessels of head and neck.
