= Superficial cervical lymph nodes =

Group of lymph nodes in the neck

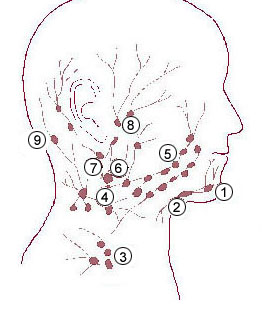
- 1: Submental lymph nodes 2: Submandibular lymph nodes 3: Supraclavicular lymph nodes 4: Retropharyngeal lymph nodes 5: Buccal lymph nodes 6: Superficial cervical lymph nodes 7: Jugular lymph nodes 8: Parotid lymph nodes 9: Retroauricular lymph nodes and occipital lymph nodes

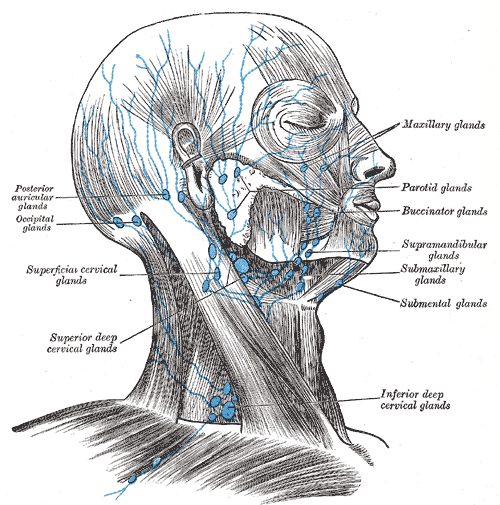
- Superficial lymph glands and lymphatic vessels of head and neck. (Superficial cervical labeled at center left.)

Details
- System: Lymphatic system
- Drains to: Superior deep cervical lymph nodes

Identifiers
- Latin: nodi lymphoidei cervicales superficiales

The superficial cervical lymph nodes are lymph nodes that lie near the surface of the neck.

Some sources state simply that they lie along the external jugular vein, while other sources state that they are only adjacent to the external jugular vein in the posterior triangle, and they are adjacent to the anterior jugular vein in the anterior triangle.

They can be broken down into:

- superficial anterior cervical lymph nodes
- superficial lateral cervical lymph nodes
