= Parotid lymph nodes =

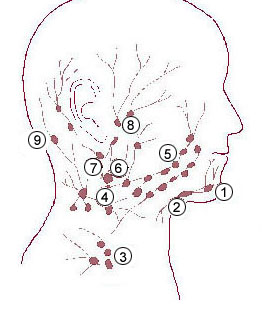
- 1: Submental lymph nodes; 2: Submandibular lymph nodes; 3: Supraclavicular lymph nodes; 4: Retropharyngeal lymph nodes; 5: Buccinator lymph node; 6: Superficial cervical lymph nodes; 7: Jugular lymph nodes; 8: Parotid lymph nodes; 9: Retroauricular lymph nodes and occipital lymph nodes

Details
- System: Lymphatic system

Identifiers
- Latin: nodi lymphoidei parotidei

Parotid lymph nodes are lymph nodes found near the parotid gland in the immune system.

More specifically, it can refer to:

- deep parotid lymph nodes
- superficial parotid lymph nodes

== Etymology ==
The word parotid comes from the Ancient Greek: πᾰρᾰ́ (pará, "beside; next to, near, from; against, contrary to") + ὠτ- (ōt-, from οὖς oûs, "ear") + -id, thus "next to, near the ear".
