= Retropharyngeal lymph nodes =

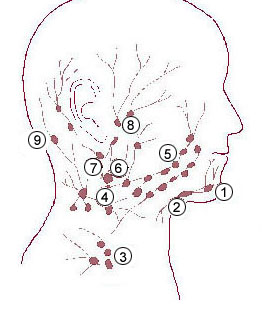
- 1: Submental lymph nodes 2: Submandibular lymph nodes 3: Supraclavicular lymph nodes 4: Retropharyngeal lymph nodes 5: Buccal lymph nodes 6: Superficial cervical lymph nodes 7: Jugular lymph nodes 8: Parotid lymph nodes 9: Retroauricular lymph nodes and occipital lymph nodes

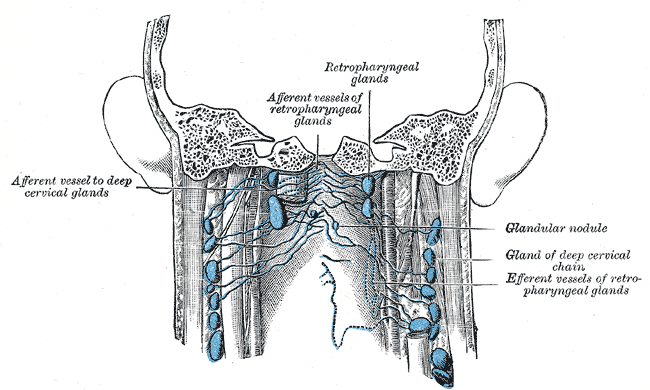
- Lymphatics of pharynx. (Retropharyngeal lymph nodes labeled at center top.)

Details
- System: Lymphatic system
- Drains to: Superior deep cervical lymph nodes

Identifiers
- Latin: nodi lymphoidei retropharyngei

The retropharyngeal lymph nodes, from one to three in number, lie in the buccopharyngeal fascia, behind the upper part of the pharynx and in front of the arch of the atlas, being separated, however, from the latter by the longus capitis.

Their afferents drain the nasal cavities, the nasal part of the pharynx, and the auditory tubes.

Their efferents pass to the superior deep cervical lymph nodes.

They are in the retropharyngeal space.

They frequently disappear by age 4-5. (This is why retropharyngeal abscess is rare in older children.)

== See also ==
- Rouvière node
