= Submental lymph nodes =

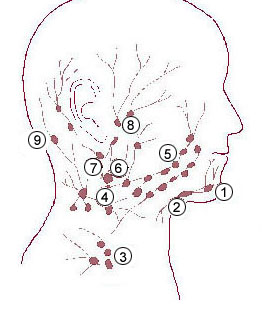
- 1: Submental lymph nodes 2: Submandibular lymph nodes 3: Supraclavicular lymph nodes 4: Retropharyngeal lymph nodes 5: Buccinator lymph node 6: Superficial cervical lymph nodes 7: Jugular lymph nodes 8: Parotid lymph nodes 9: Retroauricular lymph nodes and occipital lymph nodes

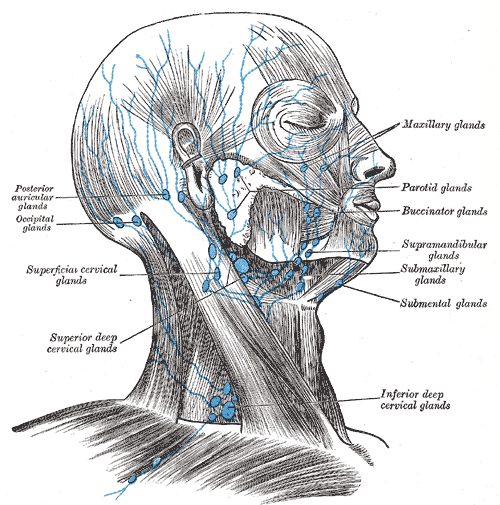
- Superficial lymph glands and lymphatic vessels of head and neck. (Buccinator glands labeled at center right.)

Details
- System: Lymphatic system

Identifiers
- Latin: nodi lymphoidei submentales

The submental lymph nodes (or suprahyoid lymph nodes) are 2-3 lymph nodes situated in the submental triangle, between the anterior bellies of the digastric muscle and the hyoid bone.

== Anatomy ==
The submental lymph nodes are situated in the submental fascial space. They are situated close to the midline. They are immediately superficial to the mylohyoid muscle.

=== Afferents ===
They drain the lower lip, floor of the mouth, apex of the tongue, chin, and inferior/mandibular incisor teeth and their associated periodontium and gingiva.

=== Efferents ===
They drain either to submandibular lymph nodes (which then drain to deep cervical lymph nodes), or to the deep cervical lymph nodes directly.

== Clinical significance ==
The most common cause of enlargement of the submental lymph nodes are infections (including viral infections such as mononucleosis, Epstein-Barr virus infection, and cytomegaloviral infections), toxoplasmosis, and dental infections (e.g. periodontitis)).

The lymph nodes may be affected by metastatic spread from cancers of their drained territories.

== See also ==
- Submental triangle
