= Sappey =

Sappey may refer to:

== People ==
- Christina Sappey (born 1962), American politician active in Pennsylvania
- Marie Philibert Constant Sappey (1810–1896), French anatomist
  - Sappey's plexus, or subareolar lymphatic plexus, part of lymphatic system in the breast
  - veins of Sappey, paraumbilical veins in the abdominal wall
- Victor Sappey (1801–1856), French sculptor

== Places ==
- Le Sappey, village and commune in the Haute-Savoie department of France
- Le Sappey-en-Chartreuse, village and commune in the Isère department of France

== See also ==
- Sappy (disambiguation)
- Brigitte François-Sappey (born 1944), French musicologist
