= Buccinator lymph node =

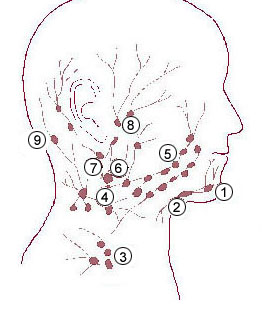
- 1: Submental lymph nodes 2: Submandibular lymph nodes 3: Supraclavicular lymph nodes 4: Retropharyngeal lymph nodes 5: Buccinator lymph node 6: Superficial cervical lymph nodes 7: Jugular lymph nodes 8: Parotid lymph nodes 9: Retroauricular lymph nodes and occipital lymph nodes

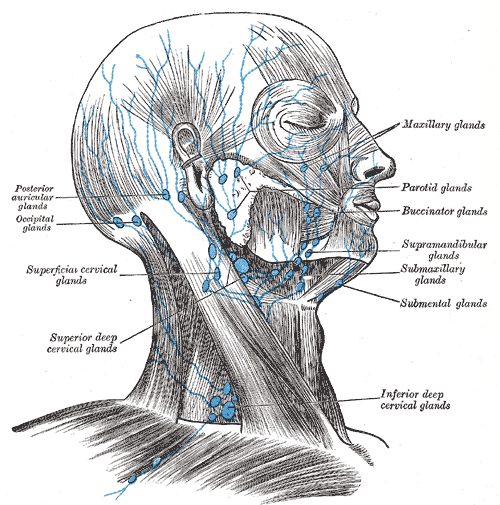
- Superficial lymph glands and lymphatic vessels of head and neck. (Buccinator glands labeled at center right.)

Details
- System: Lymphatic system
- Source: Nasolabial lymph node

Identifiers
- Latin: nodus lymphoideus buccinatorius

The buccinator lymph node or nodes are one or more lymph nodes placed on the buccinator opposite the angle of the mouth.
