= Lateral cervical lymph nodes =

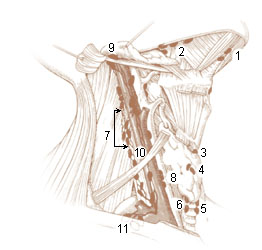
- Deep Lymph Nodes: 1. Submental; 2. Submandibular (Submaxillary); Anterior Cervical Lymph Nodes (Deep): 3. Prelaryngeal; 4. Thyroid; 5. Pretracheal; 6. Paratracheal; Deep Cervical Lymph Nodes: 7. Lateral jugular 8. Anterior jugular 9. Jugulodigastric; Inferior Deep Cervical Lymph Nodes: 10. Juguloomohyoid; 11. Supraclavicular (scalene)

Details
- System: Lymphatic system

Identifiers
- Latin: nodi lymphoidei cervicales laterales

The lateral cervical lymph nodes are a group of lymph nodes found in the lateral side of the neck.

Terminologia Anatomica divides them into:

- Superficial lateral cervical lymph nodes
- Deep lateral cervical lymph nodes

Another source divides this group into "internal jugular", "spinal accessory", and "transverse cervical".
