= Auricular glands =

Auricular glands can refer to:

- Anterior auricular glands or preauricular deep parotid lymph nodes
- Posterior auricular glands or mastoid lymph nodes
