= Submandibular lymph nodes =

Lymph nodes near the jaw

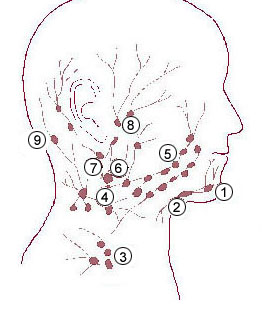
- 1: Submental lymph nodes 2: Submandibular lymph nodes 3: Supraclavicular lymph nodes 4: Retropharyngeal lymph nodes 5: Buccinator lymph node 6: Superficial cervical lymph nodes 7: Jugular lymph nodes 8: Parotid lymph nodes 9: Retroauricular lymph nodes and occipital lymph nodes

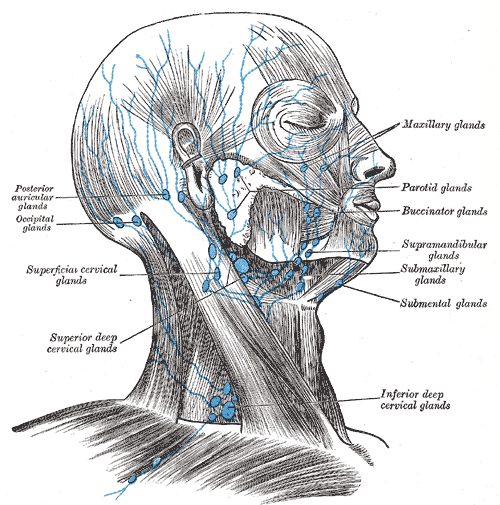
- Superficial lymph glands and lymphatic vessels of head and neck. (Submaxillary glands labeled at center right.)

Details
- System: Lymphatic system
- Source: Mandibular lymph node

Identifiers
- Latin: nodi lymphoidei submandibulares

The submandibular lymph nodes (submaxillary glands in older texts), are some 3-6 lymph nodes situated at the inferior border of the ramus of mandible.

== Anatomy ==
They are situated just superficial to the submandibular salivary gland, and posterolateral to the anterior belly of either digastric muscle.

One gland, the middle gland of Stahr, which lies on the facial artery as it turns over the mandible, is the most constant of the series; small lymph glands are sometimes found on the deep surface of the submandibular gland.

=== Afferents ===
They drain the upper lip, body of tongue, cheeks, anterior portion of the hard palate, and most teeth with their associated periodontium and gingiva (except for the mandibular incisor teeth and third molar teeth).

The facial and submental lymph nodes may also drain into the submandibular glands.

=== Efferents ===
They drain to the superior deep cervical lymph nodes.

== Clinical significance ==
The most common causes of enlargement of the submandibular lymph nodes are infections of the head, neck, ears, eyes, nasal sinuses, pharynx, and scalp.

The lymph glands may be affected by metastatic spread of cancers of the oral cavity, anterior portion of the nasal cavity, soft tissues of the mid-face, and submandibular salivary gland.

== Additional images ==
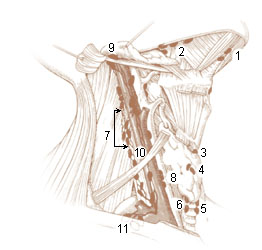
Deep lymph nodes
