= Anterior cervical lymph nodes =

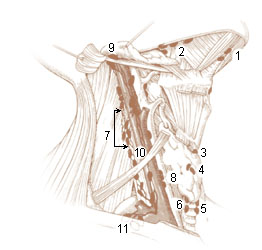
- Deep Lymph Nodes: 1. Submental; 2. Submandibular (Submaxillary); Anterior Cervical Lymph Nodes (Deep): 3. Prelaryngeal; 4. Thyroid; 5. Pretracheal; 6. Paratracheal; Deep Cervical Lymph Nodes: 7. Lateral jugular 8. Anterior jugular 9. Jugulodigastric; Inferior Deep Cervical Lymph Nodes: 10. Juguloomohyoid; 11. Supraclavicular (scalene)

Details
- System: Lymphatic system

Identifiers
- Latin: nodi lymphoidei cervicales anteriores

The anterior cervical lymph nodes are a group of nodes found on the anterior part of the neck, in front of the sternocleidomastoid muscle. These can be grouped into a deep and superficial group.

The superficial group drain the superficial surfaces of the anterior neck.
