= Thyroid lymph nodes =

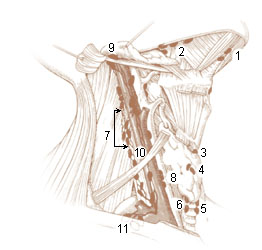
- 4. Thyroid

Details
- System: Lymphatic system

Identifiers
- Latin: nodi lymphoidei thyreoidei

The thyroid lymph nodes are deep anterior cervical lymph nodes found near the thyroid gland on the neck.
