= Nasolabial lymph node =

Facial lymph node near the nose and upper lip

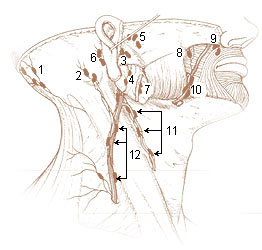
- 9. Nasolabial

Details
- System: Lymphatic system
- Drains to: Buccinator lymph node

Identifiers
- Latin: nodus lymphoideus nasolabialis

The nasolabial lymph node is a facial node found near the nose and upper lip.
