= Buccinator (disambiguation) =

The buccinator muscle is a muscle at the side of the face.

Buccinator may also refer to:

- Buccinator artery ("buccal" in modern sources)
- Buccinator lymph node
- Buccinator nerve ("buccal" in modern sources)
- An ancient Roman buccina player
- A Slavic commander at the Battle of Yarmouk
