= Facial lymph nodes =

Lymph nodes of the face

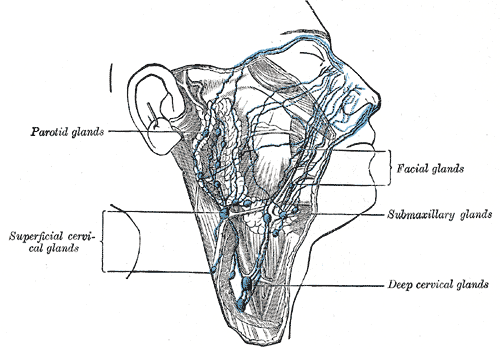
- The lymphatics of the face.

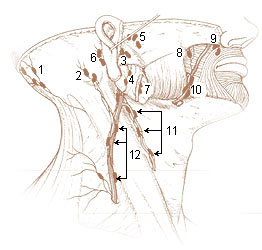
- Facial lymph nodes labelled 8 - 12

Details
- System: Lymphatic system

Identifiers
- Latin: nodi lymphoidei faciales
- FMA: 233946

The facial lymph nodes are a group of up to 12 superficial lymph nodes of the head situated along the length of the facial vein. Facial lymph nodes are variable in number, usually small. They are further divided into 4 groups:

- Malar (also infraorbital or maxillary) lymph nodes - situated in the infraorbital region (from the groove between the nose and cheek anteriorly, to the zygomatic arch posteriorly).
- Nasolabial lymph nodes - situated along the nasolabial sulcus.
- Buccal lymph nodes - situated immediately superficial to the bucinator muscle, opposite the angle of the mouth. They are one or more in number.
- Mandibular lymph nodes - situated within tissues superior to the surface of the mandible and anterior to the masseter muscle, and placed alongside and in contact with external maxillary artery and anterior facial vein.

== Territory ==
Each subgroup is responsible for drainage of adjacent skin and mucosae. Their afferent vessels drain the eyelids, the conjunctiva, and the skin and mucous membrane of the nose and cheek.

Superoinferiorly, each node drains into the one immediately inferior to it, with the last draining into submandibular lymph nodes (which in turn drain to the deep cervical lymph nodes).

== Clinical examination ==
During physical examination, these nodes are palpated bilaterally from the infraorbital region to the labial commissure and then to the mandible.

When undergoing lymphadenopathy, these nodes are described as feeling like a "firm pea". Lymphadenopathy of these nodes may be result from dental infections.
