= Deep cervical lymph nodes =

Group of lymph nodes in the neck

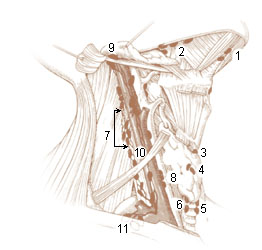
- Deep Lymph Nodes: 1. Submental; 2. Submandibular (Submaxillary); Anterior Cervical Lymph Nodes (Deep): 3. Prelaryngeal; 4. Thyroid; 5. Pretracheal; 6. Paratracheal; Deep Cervical Lymph Nodes: 7. Lateral jugular 8. Anterior jugular 9. Jugulodigastric; Inferior Deep Cervical Lymph Nodes: 10. Juguloomohyoid; 11. Supraclavicular (scalene)

Details
- System: Lymphatic system
- Drains to: Jugular trunk

Identifiers
- Latin: nodi lymphoidei cervicales profundi

The deep cervical lymph nodes are a group of cervical lymph nodes in the neck that form a chain along the internal jugular vein within the carotid sheath.

== Structure ==
=== Classification ===
The deep cervical lymph nodes are subdivided into a superior group and an inferior group.

Alternatively, they can be divided into deep anterior cervical lymph nodes and deep lateral cervical lymph nodes.

They can also be divided into three groups: "superior deep jugular", "middle deep jugular", and "inferior deep jugular".

=== Relations ===
The deep cervical lymph nodes are contained in the carotid sheath in the neck, close to the internal jugular vein. They connect to the meningeal lymphatic vessels superiorly.

=== Afferents ===
All lymphatic vessels of the head and neck ultimately drain to the deep cervical lymph nodes - either by way of other lymph nodes or directly from tissues.

The deep cervical lymph nodes serve as the principal drainage site for both lymphatic fluid and cerebrospinal fluid carried by the meningeal lymphatic vessels of the central nervous system, making them the primary site of immune surveillance for CNS-derived antigens.

=== Efferents ===
Efferents of the deep cervical lymph nodes form the ipsilateral jugular trunk.
