= Bagnols-les-Bains =

- Part of Mont Lozère et Goulet
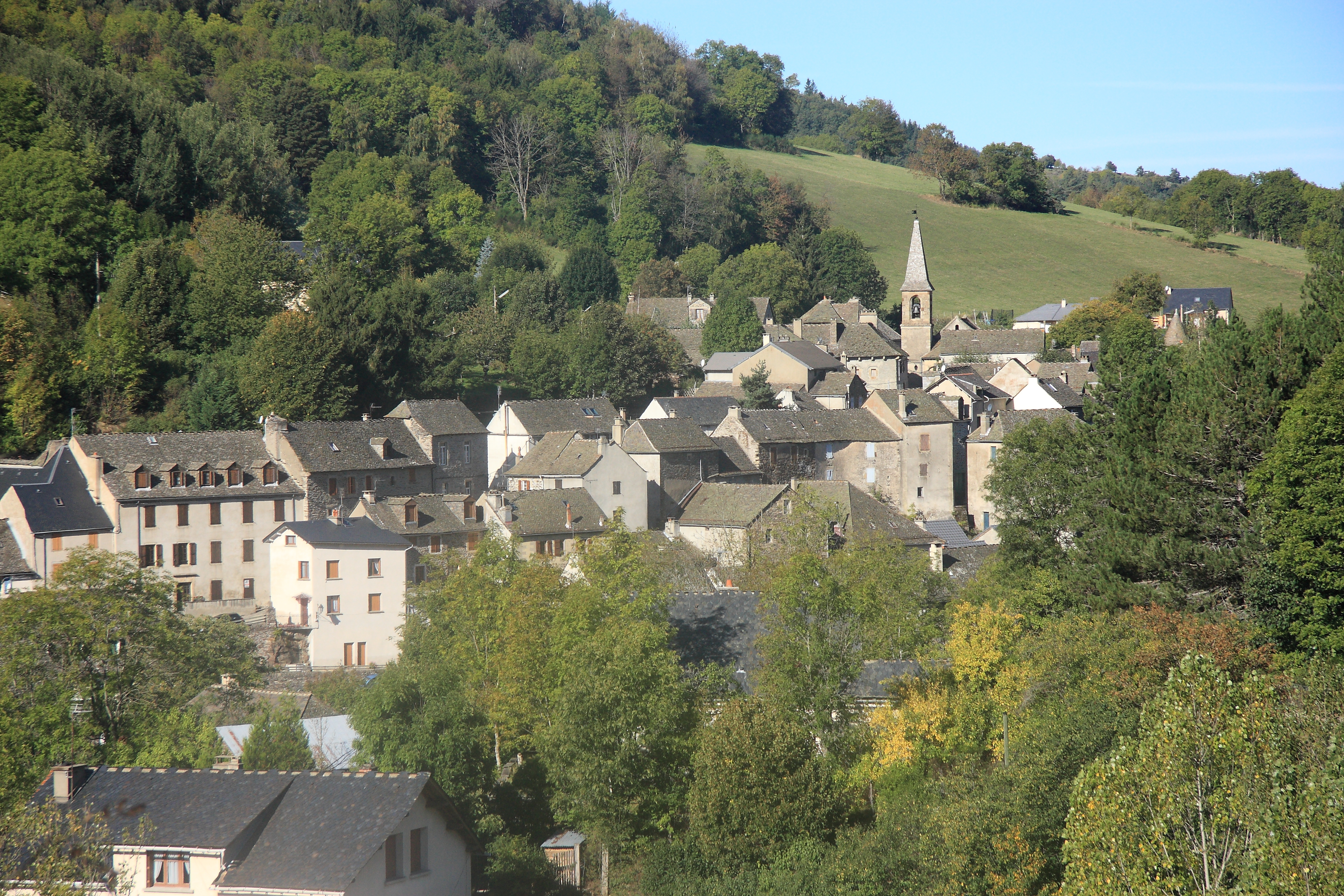
- The church and surrounding buildings in Bagnols-les-Bains

- Coat of arms
- Location of Bagnols-les-Bains
- Location within France Location within Occitanie
- Coordinates: 44°30′24″N 3°39′57″E
- Country: France
- Region: Occitania
- Department: Lozère
- Arrondissement: Mende
- Canton: Saint-Étienne-du-Valdonnez
- Commune: Mont Lozère et Goulet
- Area^{1}: 2.40 km^{2} (0.93 sq mi)
- Elevation: 913 m (2,995 ft)
- Highest elevation: 1,145 m (3,757 ft)
- Lowest elevation: 898 m (2,946 ft)
- Population (2023): 255
  - Density: 106/km^{2} (275/sq mi)
- Time zone: UTC+01:00 (CET)
  - Summer (DST): UTC+02:00 (CEST)
- Postal code: 48190
- ^{1} French Land Register data, which excludes lakes, ponds, glaciers > 1 km^{2} (0.386 sq mi or 247 acres) and river estuaries.

Bagnols-les-Bains (French pronunciation: [baɲɔl le bɛ̃]; Occitan: Banhòls) is a former commune in the Lozère department in southern France. On 1 January 2017, it was merged into the new commune Mont Lozère et Goulet.

== See also ==
- Communes of the Lozère department
