= Belvezet =

- Part of Mont Lozère et Goulet
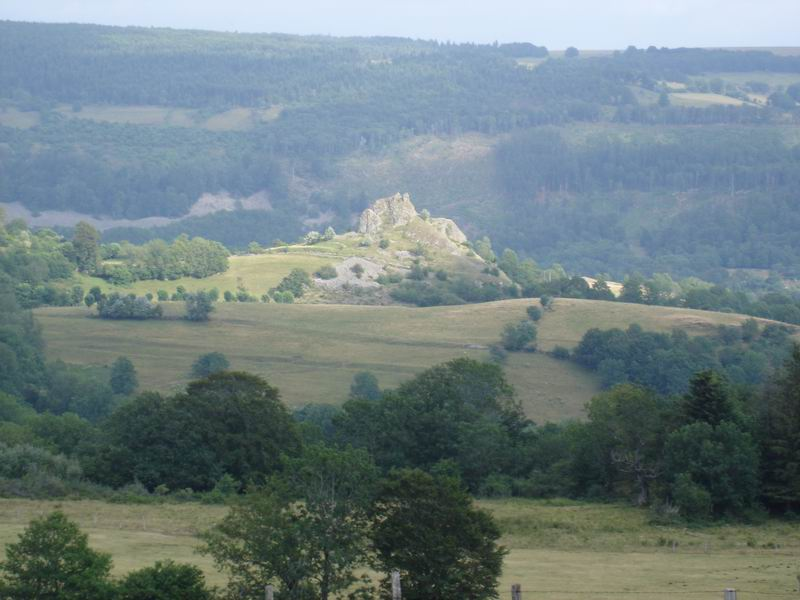
- A view of the plateau of Aubrac, in Belvezet

- Coat of arms
- Location of Belvezet
- Location within France Location within Occitanie
- Coordinates: 44°33′52″N 3°44′46″E
- Country: France
- Region: Occitania
- Department: Lozère
- Arrondissement: Mende
- Canton: Grandrieu
- Commune: Mont Lozère et Goulet
- Area^{1}: 12.39 km^{2} (4.78 sq mi)
- Elevation: 1,197 m (3,927 ft)
- Highest elevation: 1,497 m (4,911 ft)
- Lowest elevation: 1,156 m (3,793 ft)
- Population (2023): 85
  - Density: 6.9/km^{2} (18/sq mi)
- Time zone: UTC+01:00 (CET)
  - Summer (DST): UTC+02:00 (CEST)
- Postal code: 48170
- ^{1} French Land Register data, which excludes lakes, ponds, glaciers > 1 km^{2} (0.386 sq mi or 247 acres) and river estuaries.

Belvezet (French pronunciation: [bɛlvəzɛ]; Occitan: Bèlveser) is a former commune in the Lozère department in southern France. On 1 January 2017, it was merged into the new commune Mont Lozère et Goulet.

== Geography ==
The commune is traversed by the river Chassezac.

== See also ==
- Communes of the Lozère department
