= Conjunctivitis =

Inflammation of the eye

- Other names: Pink eye, Madras eye, Sore eyes
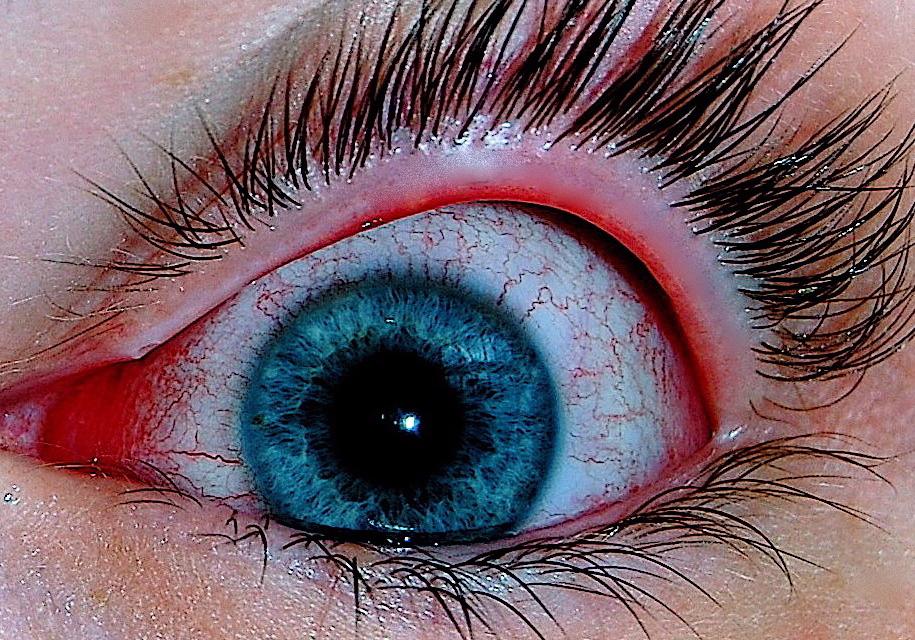
- An eye with viral conjunctivitis
- Specialty: Ophthalmology, optometry
- Symptoms: Reddish eye, scratchiness
- Duration: Viral conjunctivitis: up to two weeks
- Causes: Viral, bacterial, allergies
- Diagnostic method: Based on symptoms, microbial culture
- Prevention: Handwashing
- Treatment: Based on underlying cause
- Frequency: 3–6 million per year (US)

Conjunctivitis, also known as pink eye, is inflammation of the conjunctiva, the thin and clear layer that covers the white surface of the eye and the inner eyelid. It makes the eye appear pink or reddish. Pain, burning, scratchiness, or itchiness may occur. The affected eye may have increased tears or be stuck shut in the morning. Swelling of the sclera may also occur. Itching is more common in cases that are due to allergies. Conjunctivitis can affect one or both eyes.

The most common infectious causes in adults are viral, whereas in children bacterial causes predominate. The viral infection may occur along with other symptoms of a common cold. Both viral and bacterial cases are easily spread among people. Allergies to pollen or animal hair are also a common cause. Diagnosis is often based on signs and symptoms. Occasionally a sample of the discharge is sent for culture.

Prevention is partly by handwashing. Treatment depends on the underlying cause. In the majority of viral cases, there is no specific treatment. Most cases that are due to a bacterial infection also resolve without treatment; however antibiotics can shorten the illness. People who wear contact lenses and those whose infection is caused by gonorrhea or chlamydia should be treated. Allergic cases can be treated with antihistamines or mast cell inhibitor drops.

Between three and six million people get acute conjunctivitis each year in the United States. Typically they get better in one or two weeks. If visual loss, significant pain, sensitivity to light or signs of herpes occur, or if symptoms do not improve after a week, further diagnosis and treatment may be required. Conjunctivitis in a newborn, known as neonatal conjunctivitis, may also require specific treatment.

== Signs and symptoms ==
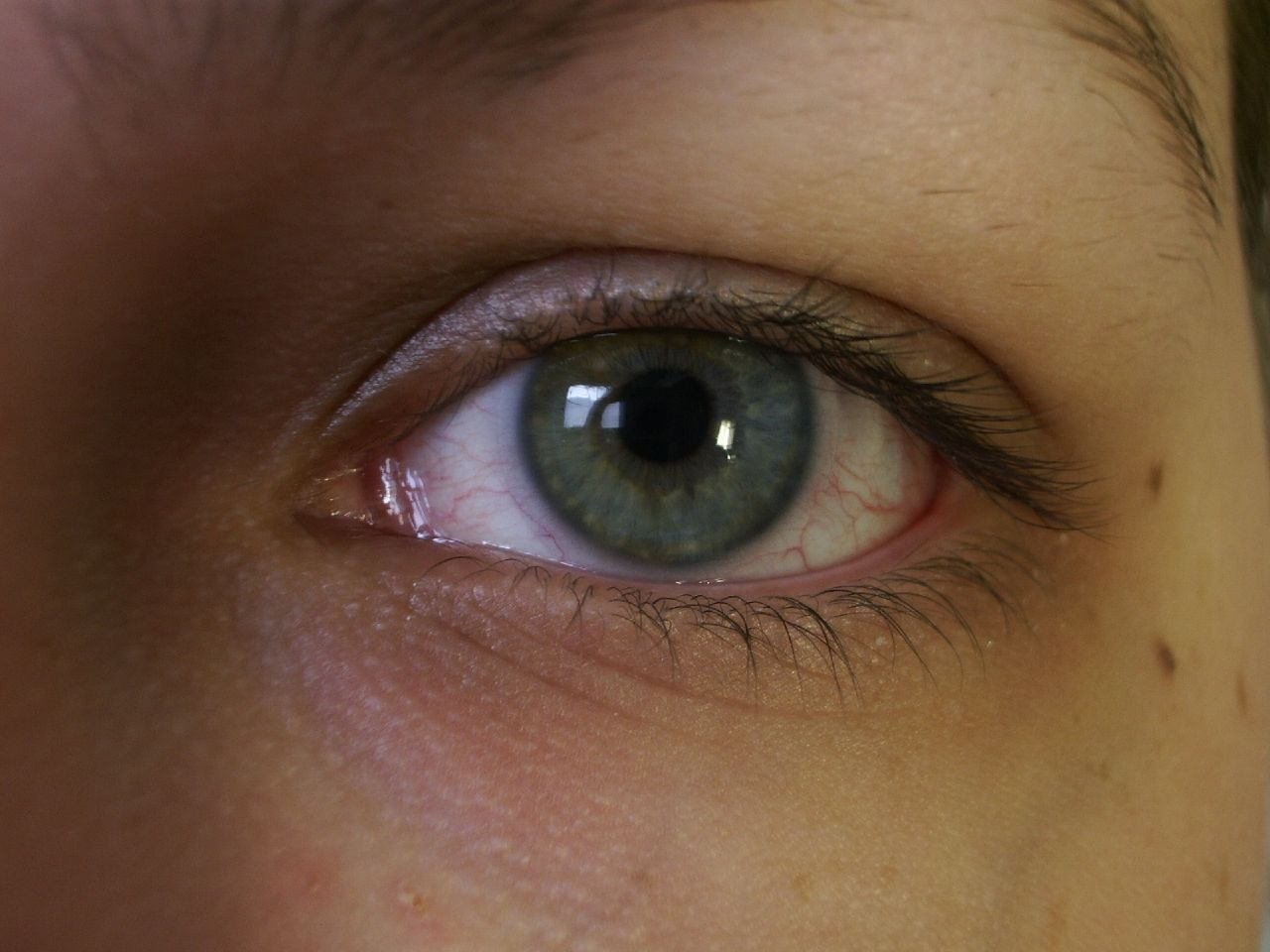
Bloodshot eyes

Red eye, swelling of the conjunctiva, and watering of the eyes are symptoms common to all forms of conjunctivitis. However, the pupils should be normally reactive, and the visual acuity should be normal.

Conjunctivitis is identified by inflammation of the conjunctiva, manifested by irritation and redness. Examination using a slit lamp (biomicroscope) may improve diagnostic accuracy. Examination of the palpebral conjunctiva, which overlies the inner aspects of the eyelids, is usually more diagnostic than examination of the bulbal conjunctiva, which overlies the sclera.

=== Viral ===
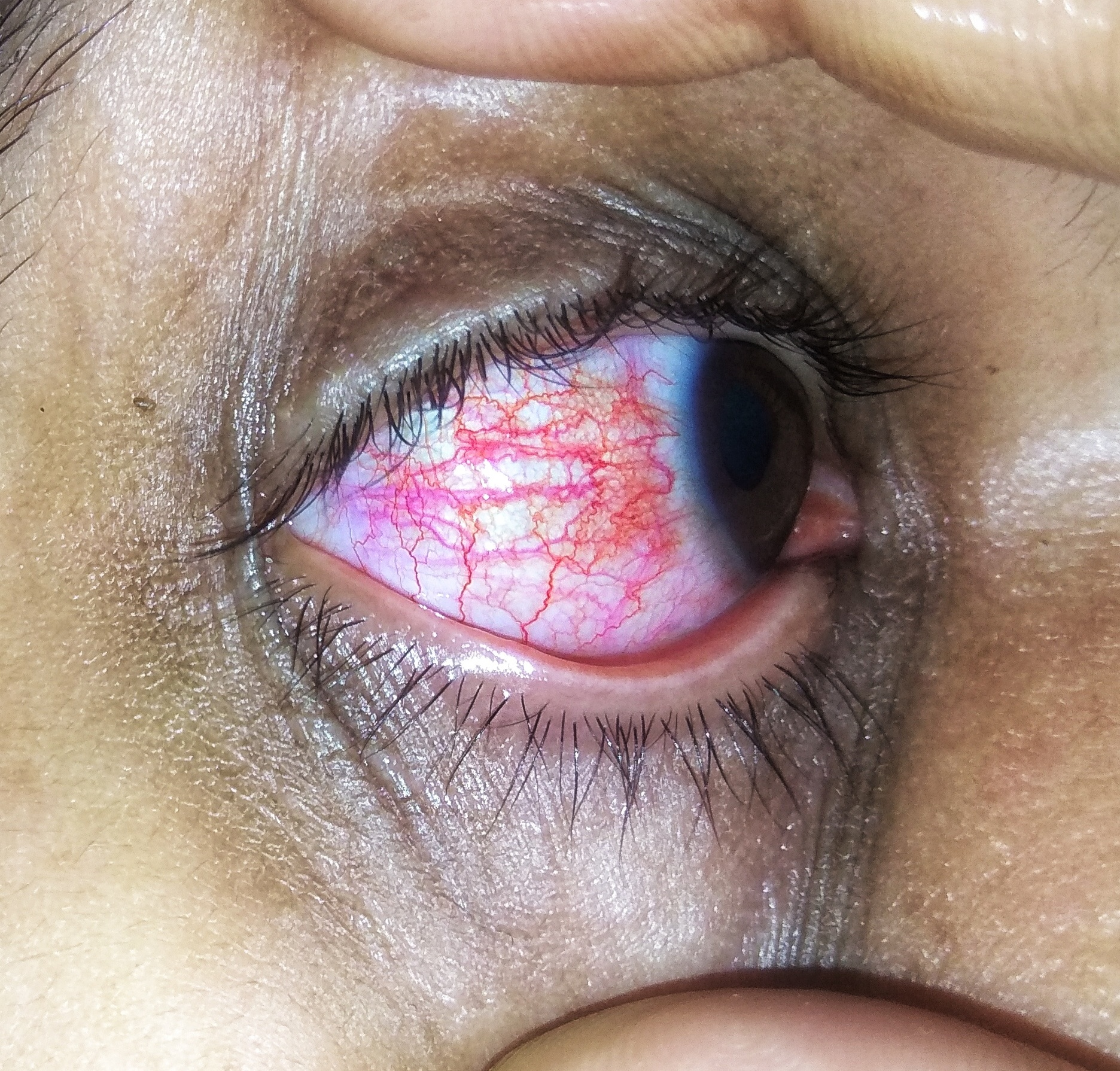
Viral conjunctivitis

Approximately 80% of cases of conjunctivitis in adults and less than 20% in children are due to viruses, with 65% to 90% of these cases being attributed to adenoviruses. Viral conjunctivitis is often associated with an infection of the upper respiratory tract, a common cold, or a sore throat. Other associated signs may include pre-auricular lymph node swelling and contact with another person with a red eye. Eye pain may be present if the cornea is also involved. Its symptoms include excessive watering and itching. The discharge in viral conjunctivitis is usually (but not always) watery. The infection usually begins in one eye but may spread easily to the other eye.

Viral conjunctivitis manifests as a fine, diffuse pinkness of the conjunctiva which may be mistaken for iritis, but corroborative signs on microscopy, particularly numerous lymphoid follicles on the tarsal conjunctiva, and sometimes a punctate keratitis are seen.

=== Allergic ===
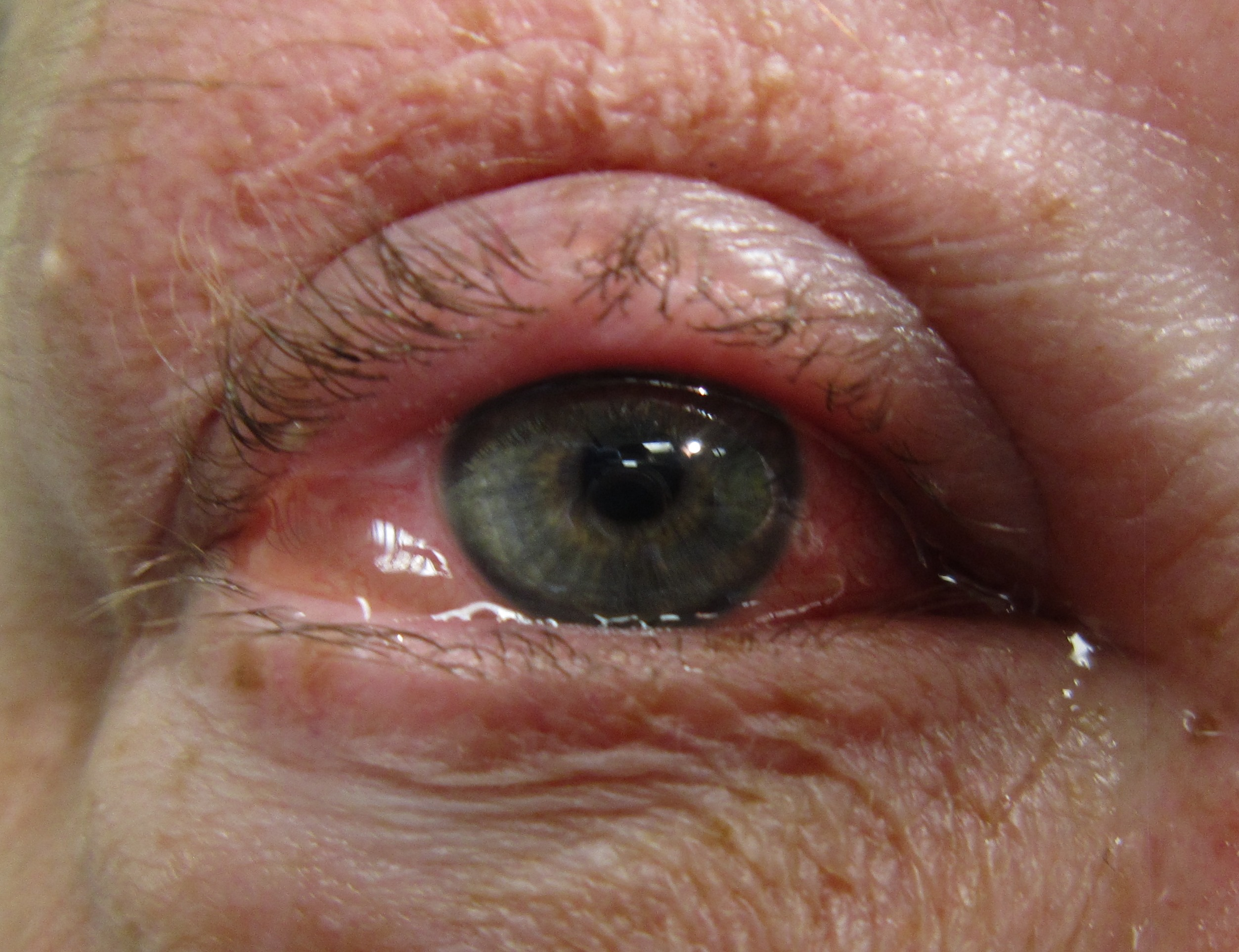
An eye with allergic conjunctivitis showing conjunctival edema

Allergic conjunctivitis is inflammation of the conjunctiva due to allergy. The specific allergens may differ among patients. Symptoms result from the release of histamine and other active substances by mast cells, and consist of redness (mainly due to vasodilation of the peripheral small blood vessels), swelling of the conjunctiva, itching, and increased production of tears.

=== Bacterial ===
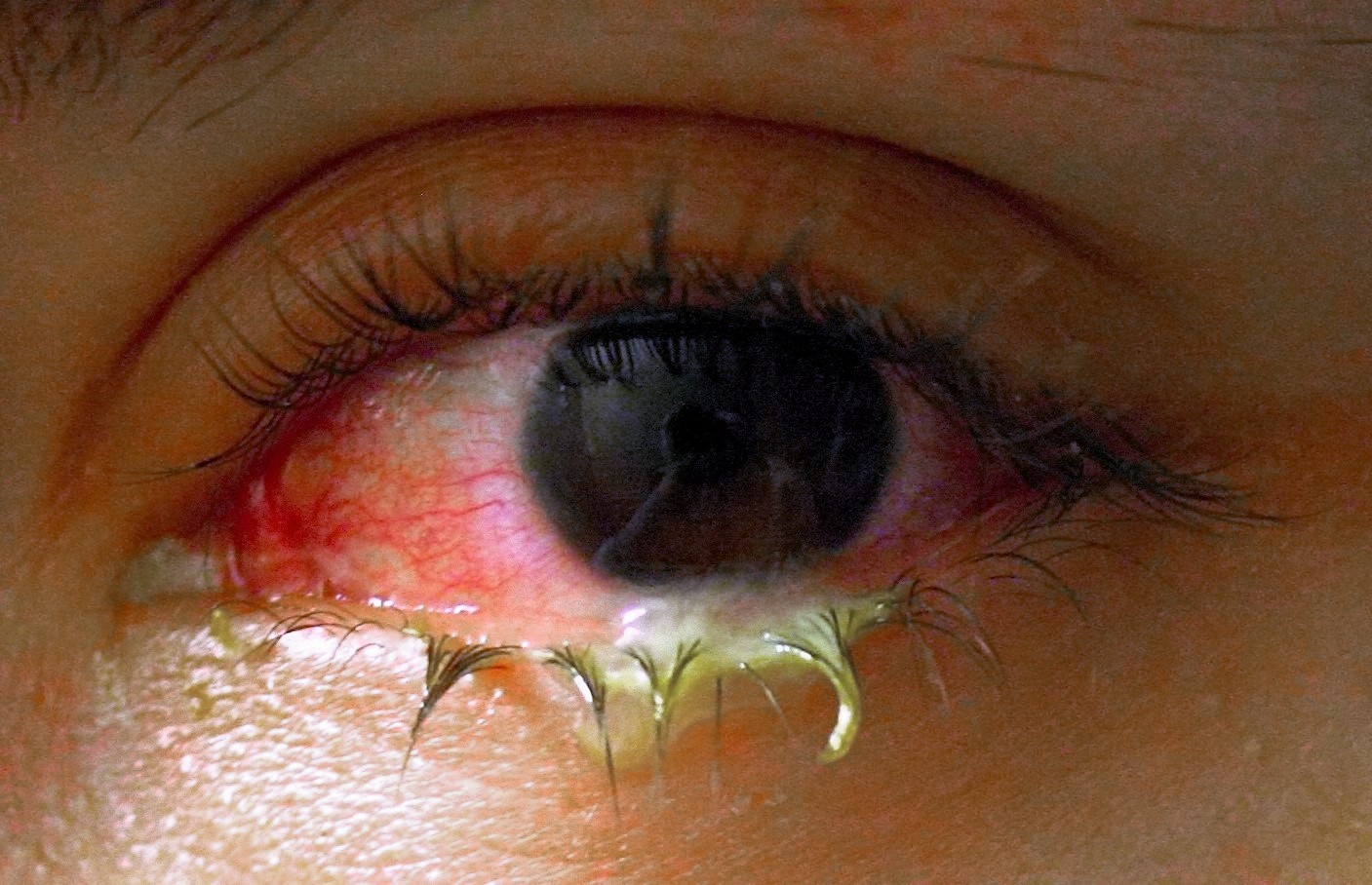
An eye with bacterial conjunctivitis

Bacteria are responsible for approximately 70% of conjunctivitis in children and less than 20% of cases in adults. Common bacteria responsible for bacterial conjunctivitis are Staphylococcus including Staph aureus, Streptococcus such as strep pneumoniae, Haemophilus species and Moraxella catarrhalis. Less commonly, Chlamydia spp. and Niesseria species (Neisseria gonorrhoeae and Neisseria meningitidis) may be the cause. Infection with Escherichia coli may also cause conjunctivitis, particularly in the neonatal subtype ophthalmia neonatorum. Bacterial conjunctivitis usually causes a rapid onset of conjunctival redness, swelling of the eyelid, and a sticky discharge. Typically, symptoms develop first in one eye, but may spread to the other eye within 2–5 days. Conjunctivitis due to common pus-producing bacteria causes marked grittiness or irritation and a stringy, opaque, greyish or yellowish discharge that may cause the lids to stick together, especially after sleep. Severe crusting of the infected eye and the surrounding skin may also occur. The gritty or scratchy feeling is sometimes localized enough that patients may insist that they have a foreign body in the eye.

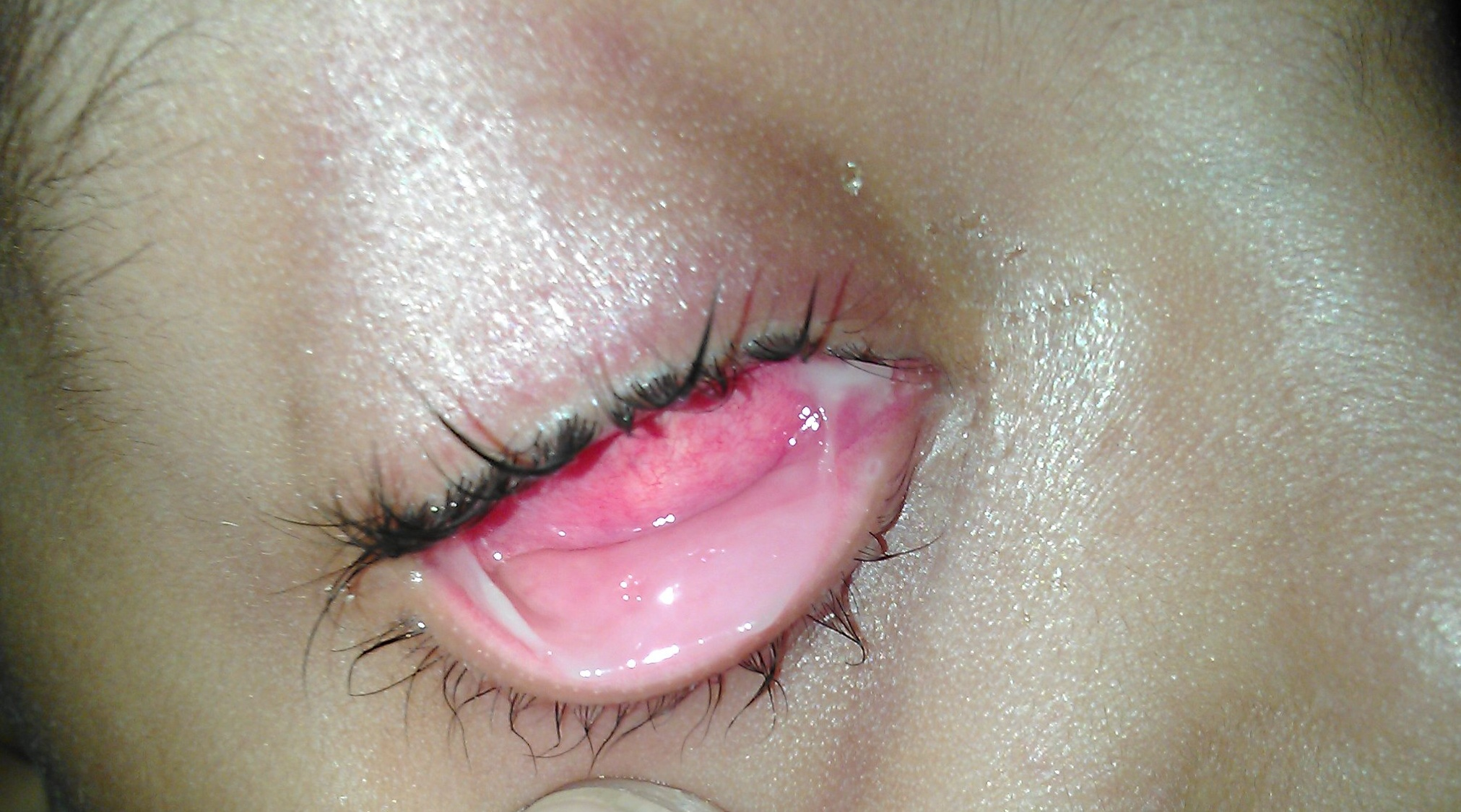
Typical membranous conjunctivitis

Bacteria such as Chlamydia trachomatis or Moraxella spp. can cause a nonexudative but persistent conjunctivitis without much redness. Bacterial conjunctivitis may cause the production of membranes or pseudomembranes that cover the conjunctiva. Pseudomembranes consist of a combination of inflammatory cells and exudates and adhere loosely to the conjunctiva, while true membranes are more tightly adherent and cannot be easily peeled away. Cases of bacterial conjunctivitis that involve the production of membranes or pseudomembranes are associated with Neisseria gonorrhoeae, β-hemolytic streptococci, and Corynebacterium diphtheriae. C. diphtheriae causes membrane formation in the conjunctiva of unimmunized children.

=== Chemical ===
Chemical eye injury may result when an acidic or alkaline substance gets in the eye. Alkali burns are typically worse than acidic burns. Mild burns produce conjunctivitis, while more severe burns may cause the cornea to turn white. Litmus paper may be used to test for chemical causes. When a chemical cause has been confirmed, the eye or eyes should be flushed until the pH is in the range 6–8. Anaesthetic eye drops can be used to decrease the pain.

Irritant or toxic conjunctivitis is primarily marked by redness. If due to a chemical splash, it is often present in only the lower conjunctival sac. With some chemicals, above all with caustic alkalis such as sodium hydroxide, necrosis of the conjunctiva marked by a deceptively white eye due to vascular closure may occur, followed by sloughing off of the dead epithelium. A slit lamp examination is likely to show evidence of anterior uveitis.

=== Biomarkers ===
Omics technologies have been used to identify biomarkers that inform on the emergence and progression of conjunctivitis. For example, in chronic inflammatory cicatrizing conjunctivitis, active oxylipins, lysophospholipids, fatty acids, and endocannabinoids alterations, from which potential biomarkers linked to inflammatory processes were identified.

=== Other ===
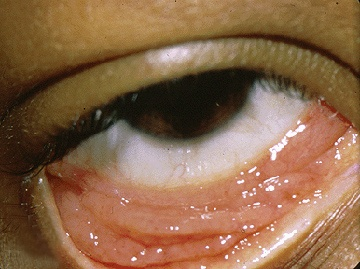
An eye with chlamydial conjunctivitis

Inclusion conjunctivitis of the newborn is a conjunctivitis that may be caused by the bacterium Chlamydia trachomatis, and may lead to acute, purulent conjunctivitis. However, it is usually self-healing.

== Causes ==
Viruses are the most common cause of infectious conjunctivitis. Bacterial infections, allergies, other irritants, and dryness are also common causes. Both bacterial and viral infections are contagious, passing from person to person or spread through contaminated objects or water. Contact with contaminated fingers is a common cause of conjunctivitis. Bacteria may also reach the conjunctiva from the edges of the eyelids and surrounding skin, from the nasopharynx, from infected eye drops or contact lenses, from the genitals, or from the bloodstream. Infection by human adenovirus accounts for 65% to 90% of cases of viral conjunctivitis.

=== Viral ===
Adenoviruses are the most common cause of viral conjunctivitis (adenoviral keratoconjunctivitis). Herpetic keratoconjunctivitis, caused by herpes simplex viruses, can be serious and requires treatment with aciclovir. Acute hemorrhagic conjunctivitis is a highly contagious disease caused by one of two enteroviruses, enterovirus 70 and coxsackievirus A24. These were first identified in an outbreak in Ghana in 1969 and have spread worldwide since then, causing several epidemics.

=== Bacterial ===
The most common causes of acute bacterial conjunctivitis are Staphylococcus aureus, Streptococcus pneumoniae, and Haemophilus influenzae. Though very rare, hyperacute cases are usually caused by Neisseria gonorrhoeae or Neisseria meningitidis. Chronic cases of bacterial conjunctivitis are those lasting longer than 3 weeks and are typically caused by S. aureus, Moraxella lacunata, or Gram-negative enteric flora.

=== Allergic ===
Conjunctivitis may also be caused by allergens such as pollen, perfumes, cosmetics, smoke, dust mites, Balsam of Peru, or eye drops. The most frequent cause of conjunctivitis is allergic conjunctivitis, and it affects 15% to 40% of the population. Allergic conjunctivitis accounts for 15% of eye related primary care consultations; most including seasonal exposures in the spring and summer or perpetual conditions.

=== Other ===
- Computer vision syndrome
- Dry eye syndrome
- Reactive arthritis: Conjunctivitis is part of the triad of reactive arthritis, which is thought to be caused by autoimmune cross-reactivity following certain bacterial infections. Reactive arthritis is highly associated with HLA-B27. Conjunctivitis is associated with the autoimmune disease relapsing polychondritis.

== Diagnosis ==
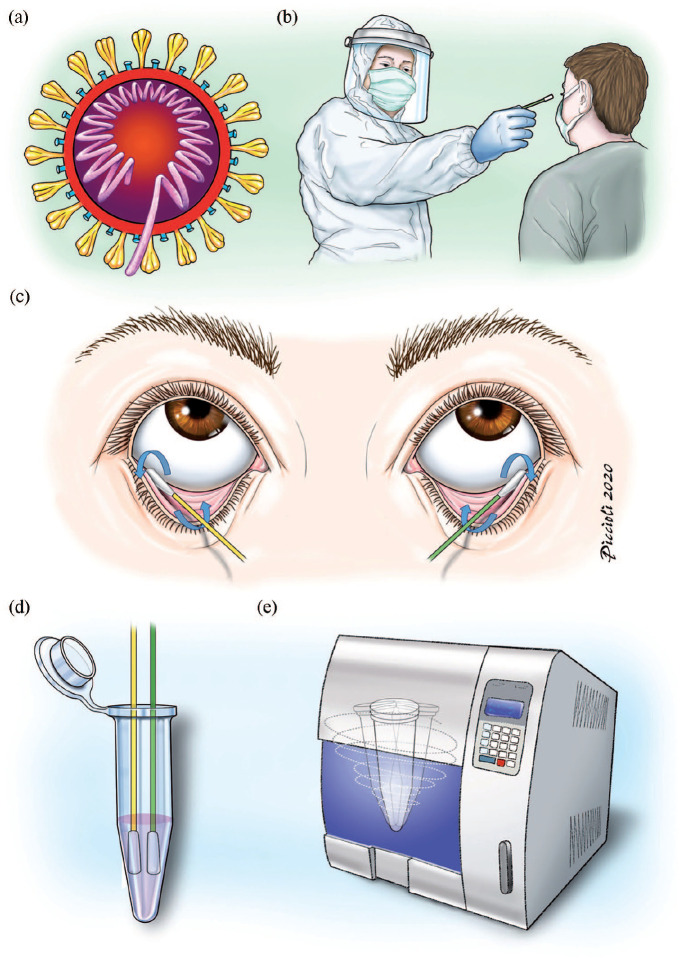
The procedure of conjunctival swabs

Cultures are not often taken or needed, as most cases resolve either with time or typical antibiotics. If bacterial conjunctivitis is suspected, but no response to topical antibiotics is seen, swabs for bacterial culture should be taken and tested. Viral culture may be appropriate in epidemic case clusters.

A patch test is used to identify the causative allergen in allergic conjunctivitis.

Although conjunctival scrapes for cytology can be useful in detecting chlamydial and fungal infections, allergies, and dysplasia, they are rarely done because of the cost and the general dearth of laboratory staff experienced in handling ocular specimens. Conjunctival incisional biopsy is occasionally done when granulomatous diseases (e.g., sarcoidosis) or dysplasia are suspected.

=== Classification ===
Conjunctivitis may be classified either by cause or by extent of the inflamed area.

==== Causes ====
- Allergy
- Bacteria
- Viruses
- Chemicals
- Autoimmune

Neonatal conjunctivitis is often grouped separately from bacterial conjunctivitis because it is caused by different bacteria than the more common cases of bacterial conjunctivitis.

==== By extent of involvement ====
Blepharoconjunctivitis is the dual combination of conjunctivitis with blepharitis (inflammation of the eyelids).

Keratoconjunctivitis is the combination of conjunctivitis and keratitis (corneal inflammation).

Blepharokeratoconjunctivitis is the combination of conjunctivitis with blepharitis and keratitis. It is clinically defined by changes of the lid margin, meibomian gland dysfunction, redness of the eye, conjunctival chemosis, and corneal inflammation.

=== Differential diagnosis ===
Some more serious conditions can present with a red eye, such as infectious keratitis, angle-closure glaucoma, or iritis. These conditions require the urgent attention of an ophthalmologist. Signs of such conditions include decreased vision, significantly increased sensitivity to light, inability to keep the eye open, a pupil that does not respond to light, or a severe headache with nausea. Fluctuating blurring is common, due to tearing and mucoid discharge. Mild photophobia is common. However, if any of these symptoms is prominent, considering other diseases such as glaucoma, uveitis, keratitis, and even meningitis or carotico-cavernous fistula is important.

A more comprehensive differential diagnosis for the red or painful eye includes:

- Corneal abrasion
- Subconjunctival hemorrhage
- Pinguecula
- Blepharitis
- Dacryocystitis
- Keratoconjunctivitis sicca (dry eye)
- Keratitis
- Herpes simplex
- Herpes zoster
- Episcleritis – an inflammatory condition that produces a similar appearance to conjunctivitis, but without discharge or tearing
- Uveitis
- Acute angle-closure glaucoma
- Endophthalmitis
- Orbital cellulitis

== Prevention ==
The most effective prevention is good hygiene, especially avoiding rubbing the eyes with infected hands. Vaccination against some of the causative pathogens, such as Haemophilus influenzae, pneumococcus, and Neisseria meningitidis is also effective.

Povidone-iodine eye solution has been found to prevent neonatal conjunctivitis. It is becoming more commonly used globally because of its low cost.

== Management ==
Conjunctivitis resolves in 65% of cases without treatment, within 2–5 days. The prescription of antibiotics is not necessary in most cases.

=== Viral ===
Viral conjunctivitis usually resolves on its own and does not require any specific treatment. Antihistamines (e.g., diphenhydramine) or mast cell stabilizers (e.g., cromolyn) may be used to help with the symptoms. Povidone-iodine has been suggested as a treatment, but as of 2008, evidence to support it was poor.

=== Allergic ===
For allergic conjunctivitis, cool water poured over the face with the head inclined downward constricts capillaries, and artificial tears sometimes relieve discomfort in mild cases. In more severe cases, nonsteroidal anti-inflammatory medications and antihistamines may be prescribed. Persistent allergic conjunctivitis may also require topical steroid drops.

=== Bacterial ===
Bacterial conjunctivitis usually resolves without treatment. Topical antibiotics may be needed only if no improvement is observed after 3 days. No serious effects were noted either with or without treatment. Because antibiotics speed healing in bacterial conjunctivitis, their use may be considered. Antibiotics are also recommended for those who wear contact lenses, are immunocompromised, have disease which is thought to be due to chlamydia or gonorrhea, have a fair bit of pain, or have copious discharge. Gonorrheal or chlamydial infections require both oral and topical antibiotics.

The choice of antibiotic varies based on the strain or suspected strain of bacteria causing the infection. Fluoroquinolones, sodium sulfacetamide, or trimethoprim/polymyxin may be used, typically for 7–10 days. Cases of meningococcal conjunctivitis can also be treated with systemic penicillin, as long as the strain is sensitive to penicillin.

When investigated as a treatment, povidone-iodine ophthalmic solution has also been observed to have some effectiveness against bacterial and chlamydial conjunctivitis, with a possible role suggested in locations where topical antibiotics are unavailable or costly.

=== Chemical ===
Conjunctivitis due to chemicals is treated via irrigation with Ringer's lactate or saline solution. Chemical injuries, particularly alkali burns, are medical emergencies, as they can lead to severe scarring and intraocular damage. People with chemically induced conjunctivitis should not touch their eyes to avoid spreading the chemical.

== Epidemiology ==
Conjunctivitis is the most common eye disease. Rates of disease are related to the underlying cause, which varies by age as well as the time of year. Acute conjunctivitis is most frequently found in infants, school-age children, and the elderly. The most common cause of infectious conjunctivitis is viral conjunctivitis.

It is estimated that acute conjunctivitis affects 6 million people annually in the United States.

Some seasonal trends have been observed for the occurrence of different forms of conjunctivitis. In the Northern Hemisphere, the occurrence of bacterial conjunctivitis peaks from December to April, viral conjunctivitis peaks in the summer months, and allergic conjunctivitis is more prevalent throughout the spring and summer.

== History ==
An adenovirus was first isolated in 1953, relating to an epidemic of keratoconjunctivitis.

== Society and culture ==
Conjunctivitis imposes economic and social burdens. The cost of treating bacterial conjunctivitis in the United States was estimated to be $377 million to $857 million per year. Approximately 1% of all primary care office visits in the United States are related to conjunctivitis. Approximately 70% of all people with acute conjunctivitis present to primary care and urgent care.

== See also ==
- Conjunctival suffusion
- Ophthalmia
