= Mas-d'Orcières =

- Part of Mont Lozère et Goulet
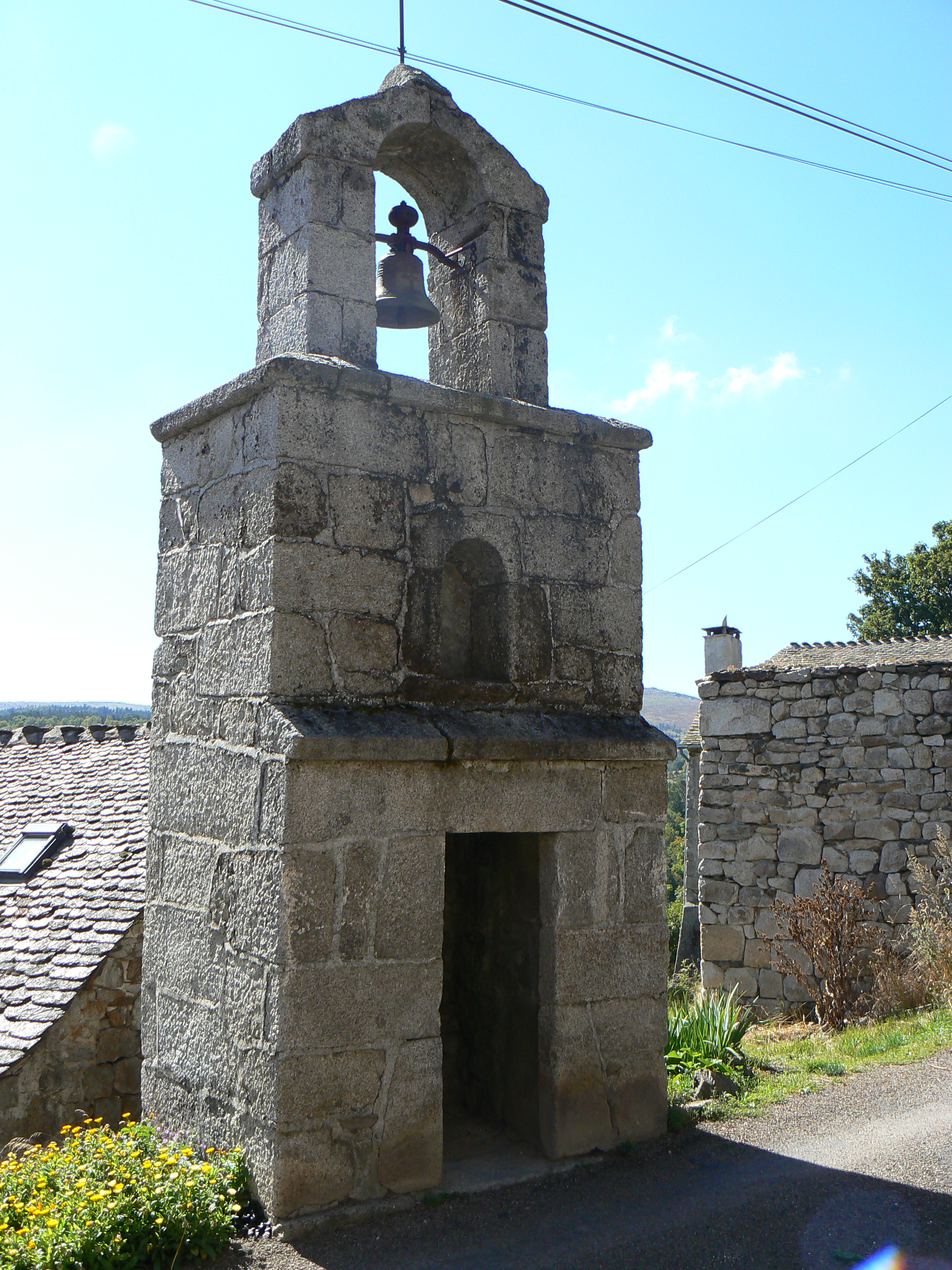
- The Clocher de tourmente de Serviès, in Mas-d'Orcière
- Location of Mas-d'Orcières
- Location within France Location within Occitanie
- Coordinates: 44°28′49″N 3°42′30″E
- Country: France
- Region: Occitania
- Department: Lozère
- Arrondissement: Mende
- Canton: Saint-Étienne-du-Valdonnez
- Commune: Mont Lozère et Goulet
- Area^{1}: 36.56 km^{2} (14.12 sq mi)
- Elevation: 1,070 m (3,510 ft)
- Highest elevation: 1,699 m (5,574 ft)
- Lowest elevation: 1,000 m (3,300 ft)
- Population (2022): 110
  - Density: 3.0/km^{2} (7.8/sq mi)
- Time zone: UTC+01:00 (CET)
  - Summer (DST): UTC+02:00 (CEST)
- Postal code: 48190
- ^{1} French Land Register data, which excludes lakes, ponds, glaciers > 1 km^{2} (0.386 sq mi or 247 acres) and river estuaries.

Mas-d'Orcières (French pronunciation: [mas dɔʁsjɛʁ]; Occitan: Mas d'Aussièira) is a former commune in the Lozère department in southern France. On 1 January 2017, it was merged into the new commune Mont Lozère et Goulet. Its population was 110 in 2022.

== See also ==
- Communes of the Lozère department
