= Le Bleymard =

- Part of Mont Lozère et Goulet
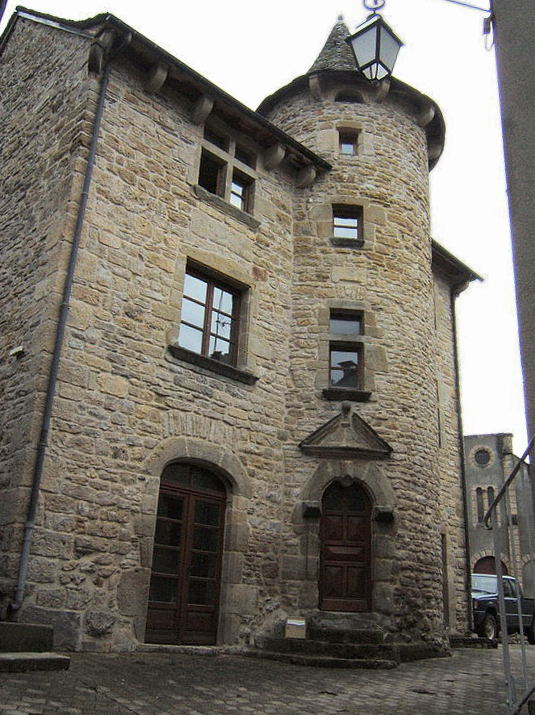
- The town hall of Le Bleymard

- Coat of arms
- Location of Le Bleymard
- Location within France Location within Occitanie
- Coordinates: 44°29′14″N 3°44′09″E
- Country: France
- Region: Occitania
- Department: Lozère
- Arrondissement: Mende
- Canton: Saint-Étienne-du-Valdonnez
- Commune: Mont Lozère et Goulet
- Area^{1}: 16.36 km^{2} (6.32 sq mi)
- Elevation: 1,069 m (3,507 ft)
- Highest elevation: 1,482 m (4,862 ft)
- Lowest elevation: 1,037 m (3,402 ft)
- Population (2023): 386
  - Density: 23.6/km^{2} (61.1/sq mi)
- Time zone: UTC+01:00 (CET)
  - Summer (DST): UTC+02:00 (CEST)
- Postal code: 48190
- ^{1} French Land Register data, which excludes lakes, ponds, glaciers > 1 km^{2} (0.386 sq mi or 247 acres) and river estuaries.

Le Bleymard (French pronunciation: [lə blemaʁ]; Occitan: Lo Blumar) is a former commune in the Lozère department in southern France. On 1 January 2017, it was merged into the new commune Mont Lozère et Goulet.

The Scottish author Robert Louis Stevenson ate in the village on the evening of 28 September 1878 before camping nearby, as recounted in his book Travels with a Donkey in the Cévennes. The Robert Louis Stevenson Trail (GR 70), a popular long-distance path following Stevenson's approximate route, runs through the village, and a three-day "Festival Stevenson" is held in the area annually. The nearby Mont Lozère is a ski resort.

== Climate ==
Climate data for Le Bleymard, 1418m (1991−2020 normals, 1998−2024 extremes)
Month	Jan	Feb	Mar	Apr	May	Jun	Jul	Aug	Sep	Oct	Nov	Dec	Year
Record high °C (°F)	18.5 (65.3)	17.1 (62.8)	18.0 (64.4)	22.2 (72.0)	25.6 (78.1)	31.6 (88.9)	30.6 (87.1)	32.7 (90.9)	26.0 (78.8)	23.6 (74.5)	18.7 (65.7)	17.8 (64.0)	32.7 (90.9)
Mean daily maximum °C (°F)	2.1 (35.8)	2.3 (36.1)	5.7 (42.3)	9.1 (48.4)	13.0 (55.4)	17.9 (64.2)	20.4 (68.7)	20.3 (68.5)	15.6 (60.1)	11.3 (52.3)	5.5 (41.9)	3.4 (38.1)	10.5 (51.0)
Daily mean °C (°F)	−0.6 (30.9)	−0.7 (30.7)	2.3 (36.1)	5.3 (41.5)	9.1 (48.4)	13.5 (56.3)	15.6 (60.1)	15.6 (60.1)	11.7 (53.1)	8.1 (46.6)	2.8 (37.0)	0.6 (33.1)	6.9 (44.5)
Mean daily minimum °C (°F)	−3.4 (25.9)	−3.7 (25.3)	−1.1 (30.0)	1.6 (34.9)	5.1 (41.2)	9.1 (48.4)	10.9 (51.6)	11.0 (51.8)	7.8 (46.0)	4.8 (40.6)	0.2 (32.4)	−2.2 (28.0)	3.3 (38.0)
Record low °C (°F)	−15.5 (4.1)	−19.1 (−2.4)	−16.7 (1.9)	−8.3 (17.1)	−4.8 (23.4)	−0.2 (31.6)	1.3 (34.3)	3.2 (37.8)	−1.4 (29.5)	−9.5 (14.9)	−12.1 (10.2)	−17.9 (−0.2)	−19.1 (−2.4)
Average precipitation mm (inches)	80.2 (3.16)	63.1 (2.48)	80.0 (3.15)	114.3 (4.50)	119.4 (4.70)	82.8 (3.26)	63.8 (2.51)	69.2 (2.72)	105.0 (4.13)	152.5 (6.00)	165.1 (6.50)	97.1 (3.82)	1,192.5 (46.93)
Source: Meteociel

== Personalities ==
- Alphonse Magnien (1837–1902), Catholic educator
- Henri Rouvière (1876–1952), Professor of anatomy

== See also ==
- Communes of the Lozère department
