= Mandibular lymph node =

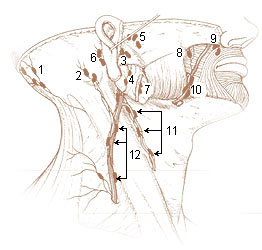
- 10. Mandibular

Details
- System: Lymphatic system
- Drains to: Submandibular lymph nodes

Identifiers
- Latin: nodus lymphoideus mandibularis

The mandibular lymph node is a lymph node found near the jaw.
