= Alphonse Magnien =

American priest and educator (1837–1902)

Alphonse Magnien (June 9, 1837 – December 21, 1902) was the superior at St. Mary's Seminary and University in Baltimore, Maryland from 1878 to 1902. He exerted a considerable influence on Roman Catholic seminary education in the United States.

== Early life ==
He was born at Le Bleymard, in Lozère. He studied classics at Chirac in Lozère, and between 1857 and 1862, philosophy and theology at the University of Orléans. He had become affiliated to the Diocese of Orléans in response to Félix Dupanloup's appeal for clerical recruits. In the seminary he developed a Sulpician vocation; but the bishop instead employed him for two years after his ordination in 1862 as professor in the preparatory seminary of La Chapelle-Saint-Mesmin. He then became successively, under the direction of his Sulpician superiors, professor of sciences at Nantes (1864–65), and professor of theology and Holy Scripture at Rodez (1866–69).

== Teaching career ==
In late 1869, Magnien began teaching at St. Mary's in Baltimore. He proved a capable teacher, first in his course of philosophy and, later, of Holy Scripture and dogma. He seemed instinctively to grasp the vital part of a question and rested content only when he had found the truth. He became superior of the seminary upon the death of Dr. Dubreul in 1878. He was naturally upright, frank, manly, and devoted to the Church and the spread of religion. He spoke to the seminarians out of the abundance of a priestly heart and from a full knowledge of priestly life. He was especially able at the rostrum; he spoke almost daily on spiritual topics without becoming tiresome. In the administration of his office there was nothing narrow or harsh. He had a keen knowledge of conditions in this country. He used to say at the close of his life "I have trusted very much and been sometimes deceived; but I know that had I trusted less I would have been still oftener deceived."

This generous and wise sentiment characterizes the man and partially reveals the secret of his influence. Magnien was loved and revered. He had strong affections; he had also strong dislikes, but not so uncontrollable as to lead him into an injustice. His personality contributed, in no small degree, to the growth and prosperity of St. Mary's Seminary. Under his administration St. Austin's College was founded at The Catholic University of America, for the recruiting of American vocations to St. Sulpice. His abilities as a churchman and a theologian were conspicuously revealed at the Third Plenary Council of Baltimore. Throughout his life, his counsel was frequently sought and highly valued by many members of the clergy. He frequently preached retreats to the clergy.

== Death ==
During the retreat at St. Louis in 1897, he was seized with an attack of a disease from which he had suffered for years. Some months later he went to Paris for special treatment, where he underwent a very dangerous operation, and returned to his post at Baltimore. His health, however, was never entirely regained and after two or three years began to fail markedly, and in the summer of 1902 he resigned, dying a few months later.
