= Mont Lozère et Goulet =

- Commune
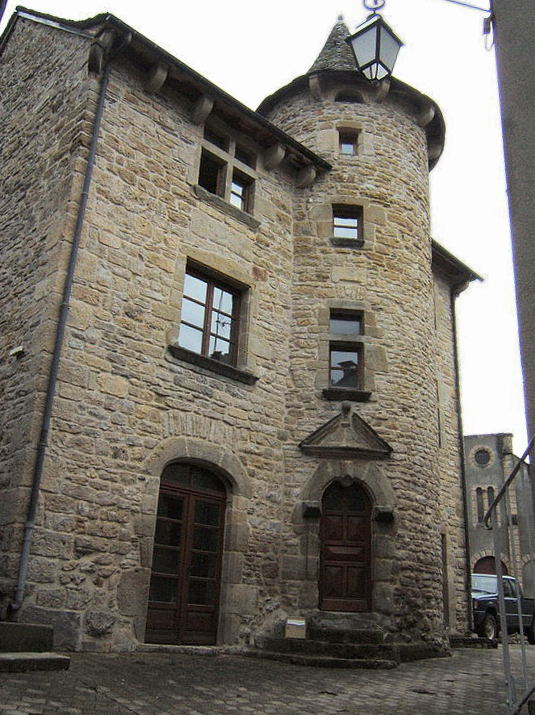
- Mont Lozère et Goulet Town hall
- Location of Mont Lozère et Goulet
- Location within France Location within Occitanie
- Coordinates: 44°29′13″N 3°44′10″E
- Country: France
- Region: Occitania
- Department: Lozère
- Arrondissement: Mende
- Canton: Saint-Étienne-du-Valdonnez
- Intercommunality: Mont-Lozère
- Area^{1}: 166.21 km^{2} (64.17 sq mi)
- Population (2023): 1,098
  - Density: 6.606/km^{2} (17.11/sq mi)
- Time zone: UTC+01:00 (CET)
  - Summer (DST): UTC+02:00 (CEST)
- INSEE/Postal code: 48027 /48170, 48190, 48250
- ^{1} French Land Register data, which excludes lakes, ponds, glaciers > 1 km^{2} (0.386 sq mi or 247 acres) and river estuaries.

Mont Lozère et Goulet (Occitan: Mont Lozère e Gargot) is a commune in the department of Lozère, southern France. The municipality was established on 1 January 2017 by merger of the former communes of Le Bleymard (the seat), Bagnols-les-Bains, Belvezet, Chasseradès, Mas-d'Orcières and Saint-Julien-du-Tournel.

== See also ==
- Communes of the Lozère department
