= Saint-Julien-du-Tournel =

- Part of Mont Lozère et Goulet
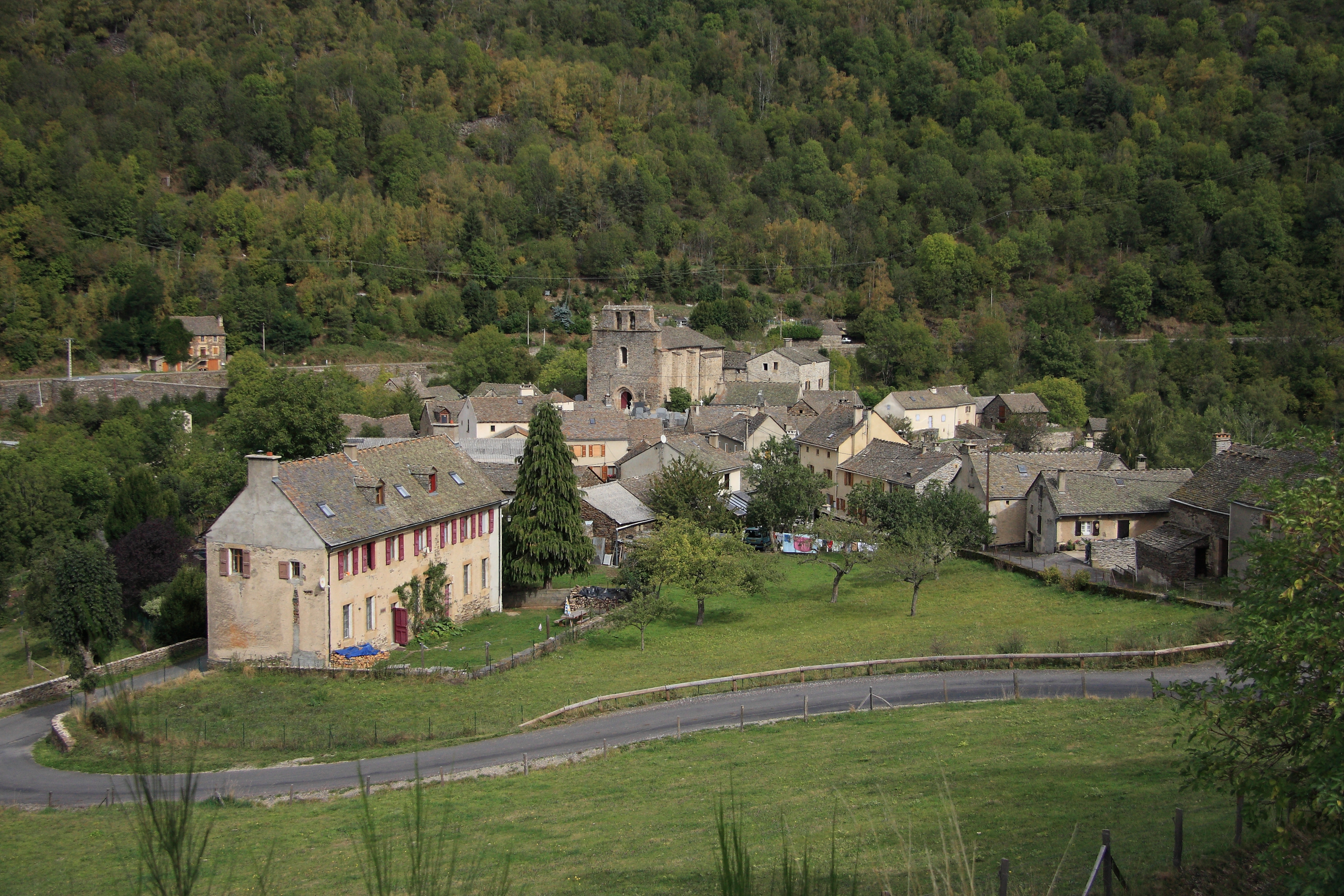
- A general view of Saint-Julien-du-Tournel
- Location of Saint-Julien-du-Tournel
- Location within France Location within Occitanie
- Coordinates: 44°30′06″N 3°41′05″E
- Country: France
- Region: Occitania
- Department: Lozère
- Arrondissement: Mende
- Canton: Saint-Étienne-du-Valdonnez
- Commune: Mont Lozère et Goulet
- Area^{1}: 38.57 km^{2} (14.89 sq mi)
- Elevation: 964 m (3,163 ft)
- Highest elevation: 1,542 m (5,059 ft)
- Lowest elevation: 912 m (2,992 ft)
- Population (2022): 114
  - Density: 2.96/km^{2} (7.66/sq mi)
- Time zone: UTC+01:00 (CET)
  - Summer (DST): UTC+02:00 (CEST)
- Postal code: 48190
- ^{1} French Land Register data, which excludes lakes, ponds, glaciers > 1 km^{2} (0.386 sq mi or 247 acres) and river estuaries.

Saint-Julien-du-Tournel (French pronunciation: [sɛ̃ ʒyljɛ̃ dy tuʁnɛl]; Occitan: Sent Julien del Tornèl) is a former commune in the Lozère department in southern France. On 1 January 2017, it was merged into the new commune Mont Lozère et Goulet. Its population was 114 in 2022.

== See also ==
- Communes of the Lozère department
