= Inferior deep cervical lymph nodes =

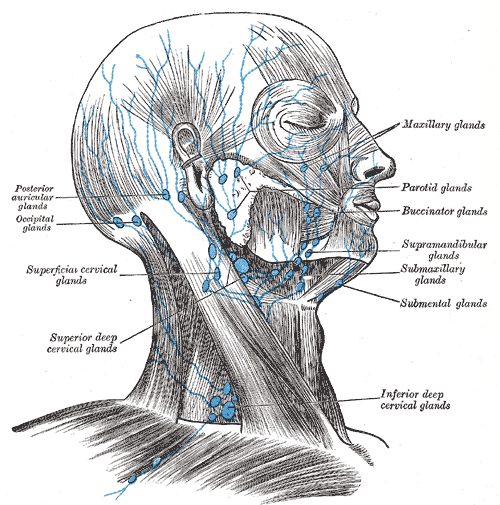
- Superficial lymph glands and lymphatic vessels of head and neck. (Inferior deep cervical glands labeled at bottom right.)

Details
- System: Lymphatic system
- Source: Superior deep cervical lymph nodes
- Drains to: Jugular trunk

Identifiers
- Latin: nodi lymphoidei cervicales laterales profundi inferiores

The inferior deep cervical lymph nodes are one of the two groups of the deep cervical lymph nodes (the other being the superior deep cervical lymph nodes).

They are situated partial deep to the sternocleidomastoid muscle. They are closely related to the inferior portion of internal jugular vein; some are also closely related to the brachial plexus, and the subclavian artery and subclavian vein (those situated in the supraclavicular triangle - beyond the posterior margin of the sternocleidomastoid muscle).

Some superior deep cervical lymph nodes drain to the inferior deep cervical lymph nodes. The inferior deep cervical lymph nodes drain to the jugular lymph trunk.
