= JAMA Otolaryngology–Head & Neck Surgery =

- Discipline: Otolaryngology
- Language: English
- Edited by: Jay F. Piccirillo

Publication details
- Former name(s): Archives of Otolaryngology–Head & Neck Surgery, A.M.A. Archives of Otolaryngology, Archives of Otolaryngology
- History: 1925-present
- Publisher: American Medical Association (United States)
- Frequency: Monthly
- Impact factor: 8.961 (2021)

Standard abbreviations
- ISO 4: JAMA Otolaryngol. Head Neck Surg.

Indexing
- ISSN: 2168-6181 (print); 2168-619X (web)
- LCCN: 2012200350
- OCLC no.: 798270938

Links
- Journal homepage; Online access; Online archive

JAMA Otolaryngology—Head & Neck Surgery is a monthly peer-reviewed medical journal published by the American Medical Association and covering all aspects of prevention, diagnosis, and treatment of diseases of the head, neck, ear, nose, and throat. The editor-in-chief is Jay F. Piccirillo (Washington University School of Medicine). It was established in 1925 as the Archives of Otolaryngology and renamed A.M.A. Archives of Otolaryngology in 1950, then renamed Archives of Otolaryngology–Head & Neck Surgery in 1960, before obtaining its current name in 2013.

According to the Journal Citation Reports, the journal has a 2021 impact factor of 8.961, ranking it 1st out of 43 titles in the category "Otorhinolaryngology".

== Naming history ==
The journal has undergone several name changes in its history:

- JAMA Otorhinolaryngology—Head & Neck Surgery (2013-present, ISSN 0886-4470)
- Archives of Otorhinolaryngology—Head & Neck Surgery (1986-2012, ISSN 1538-361X)
- Archives of Otolaryngology (1960-1986, ISSN 0003-9977)
- A.M.A. Archives of Otolaryngology (1950-1960, ISSN 0096-6339)
- Archives of Otolaryngology (1925-1950, ISSN 0276-0673)

== Abstracting and indexing ==
The journal is abstracted and indexed in Index Medicus/MEDLINE/PubMed.

== See also ==
- List of American Medical Association journals
