= Marie Philibert Constant Sappey =

French anatomist

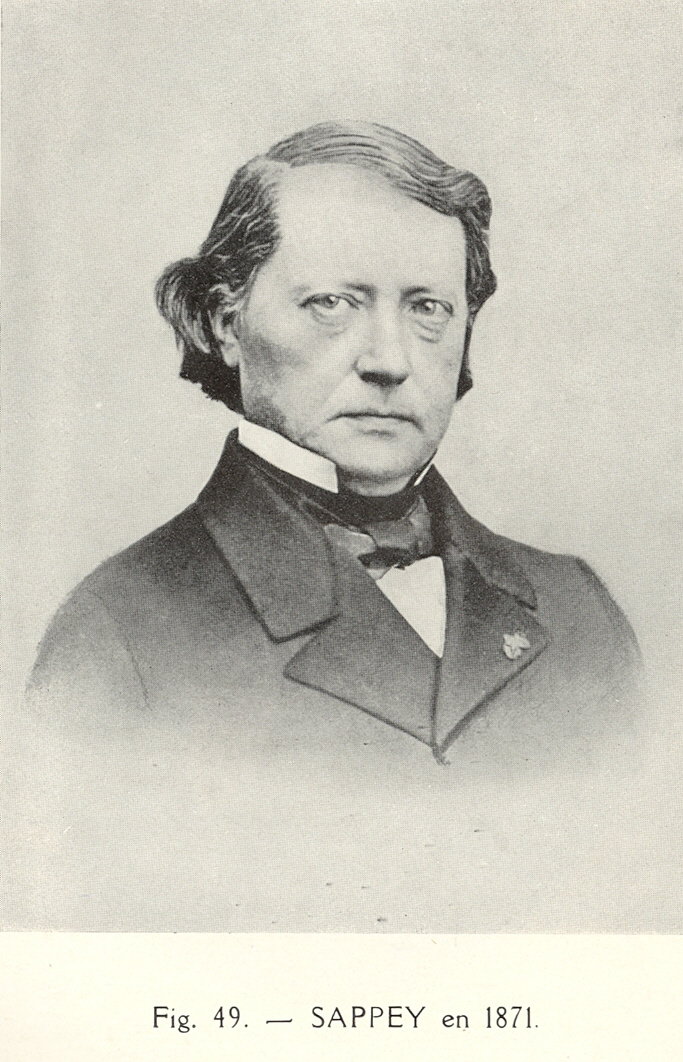
Constant Sappey (1810-1896)

Marie Philibert Constant Sappey (1810 – 15 March 1896) was a French anatomist born in Cernon, near the city of Bourg-en-Bresse.

He studied medicine at the University of Paris, earning his degree in 1843. Later he became a professor of anatomy in Paris, and in 1862 was elected to the Académie Nationale de Médecine, becoming its president in 1887. In 1868 he succeeded Jean-François Jarjavay (1815–1868) as chair of anatomy, a position he held until 1886.

Sappey was a highly regarded anatomist remembered for his research of the lymphatic system. In 1874 he published an anatomical atlas that included a detailed study of cutaneous lymphatic drainage. He was married to Antoinette Clotilde Dumas who was a scientific illustrator. She illustrated some of his publications. He devised a procedure to define and delineate the lymphatic system by injecting mercury into the skin of a cadaver in order to properly view the individual lymphatic vessels. Anatomist Henri Rouvière (1876-1952) continued Sappey's anatomical work of the human lymphatic system.

== Associated Eponyms ==
- "Sappey's plexus": lymphatic network in the areola of the nipple.
- "Sappey's veins": another name for paraumbilical veins of the accessory portal venous system.
- "Haller-Sappey ansa": anastomosis of the glossopharyngeal nerve with the auricular branch of the vagus nerve for the sensitive innervation of the ear canal. Also referred to as "Haller's ansa II", named after physiologist Albrecht von Haller (1707-1777).

== Written works ==
- Traité d’anatomie descriptive avec figures intercalées dans le texte. Paris. 3 volumes, 1847-1863. 2nd edition in 4 volumes, 1867-1874. considered to be the first French anatomical work that combined descriptive anatomy with histology.
- Anatomie, physiologie, pathologie des vaisseaux lymphatiques considerées chez l’homme et les vertébres. Paris, A. Delahaye & E. Lacrosnier, 1874. Known for its illustrations.
- Atlas d’anatomie descriptive. 1879 (Atlas of descriptive anatomy).
- Études sur l’appareil mucipare et sur le système lymphatique des poissons. 1880.
