= Preauricular deep parotid lymph nodes =

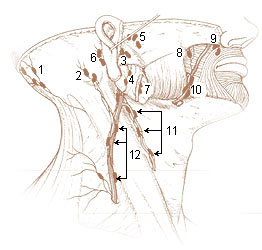
- Lymph nodes at Surface: 1. Occipital (retroauricular); 2. Mastoid; 3. Superficial Parotid; 4. Deep Parotid; 5. Preauricular; 6. Infraauricular; 7. Intraglandular parotid; Facial Lymph Nodes: 8. Buccinator; 9. Nasolabial; 10. Mandibular; 11. Anterior Cervical (Superficial jugular); 12. Superficial Cervical (External jugular)

Details
- System: Lymphatic system
- Drains from: Parotid gland
- Drains to: Superior deep cervical lymph nodes

Identifiers
- Latin: nodi lymphoidei parotidei profundi preauriculares

The preauricular deep parotid lymph nodes (anterior auricular glands or preauricular glands), from one to three in number, lie immediately in front of the tragus.

Their afferents drain multiple surfaces, most of which are lateral in origin. A specific example would be the lateral portions of the eye's bulbar and palpebral conjunctiva as well as the skin adjacent to the ear within the temporal region. The efferents of these nodes pass to the superior deep cervical glands.

The preauricular nodes glands will present with marked swelling in viral conjunctivitis.
