= Henri Rouvière =

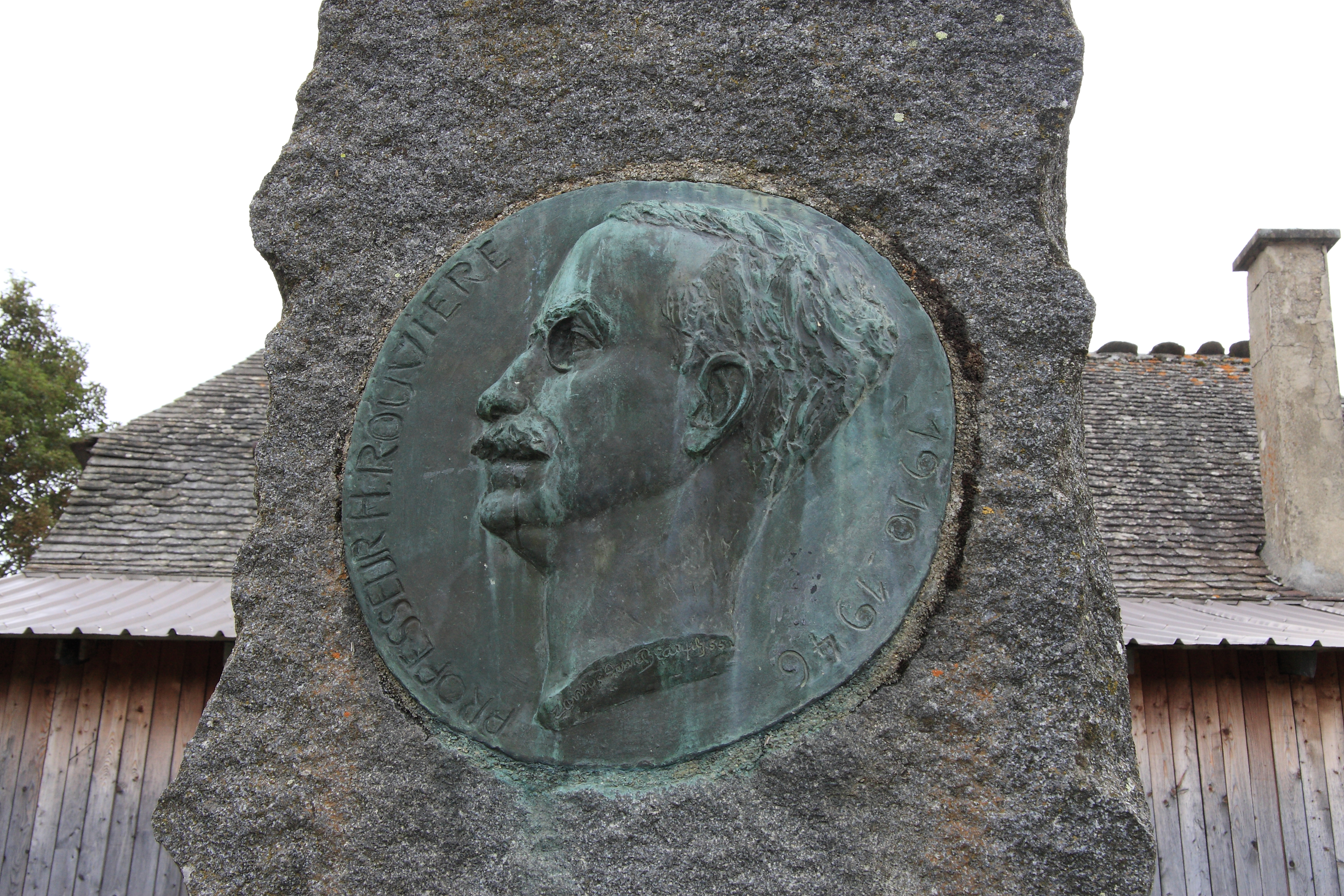
Memorial to Henri Rouvière in Bleymard in Lozère (detail)

Henri Rouvière (23 December 1876 – 26 October 1952) was a professor of anatomy born in Le Bleymard, France.

He studied in Montpellier, receiving his medical doctorate in 1903. He later became a professor of anatomy and embryology at the University of Paris. Collège Henri Rouvière in his hometown of Le Bleymard is named in his honour. Many of Rouvière's anatomical works are preserved in the Musée d'Anatomie Delmas-Orfila-Rouvière in Paris.

Rouvière is remembered for his 1932 publication of "Anatomie des Lymphatiques de l'Homme" (translated into English in 1938 as "Anatomy of the Human Lymphatic System"), an exhaustive study involving the delineation and classification of human lymph nodes and their associated drainage regions. Rouvière's work was a continuation of the seminal research of the lymphatic system done by anatomist Marie Sappey (1810-1896).

Other significant writings by Rouvière are "Anatomie humaine descriptive, topographique et fonctionnelle", "Atlas aide-mémoire d'anatomie" and "L'anatomie humaine". "Anatomie humaine descriptive, topographique et fonctionnelle" is the adopted textbook in several well known medical schools, such as Faculdade de Medicina da Universidade de Lisboa, in Lisbon, Portugal.

The eponymous "node of Rouvière" (sometimes called "Rouvière node") features his name; this node is the most superior of the lateral group of the retropharyngeal lymph nodes, and is found at the base of the skull.
