= Sappy (disambiguation) =

"Sappy" is a song by the American rock band, Nirvana.

Sappy may also refer to:

- Sappy (EP), by South Korean girl group Red Velvet
- Sappy Records, an independent record label in Sackville, New Brunswick, Canada

== See also ==
- Sappey (disambiguation)
