= Subareolar lymphatic plexus =

Lymphatic plexus of the breast

Subareolar lymphatic plexus, also known as Sappey's plexus, is the lymphatic drainage of the areola of the breast. It is a dense network of lympatics located in the dermis. The subareolar plexus of Sappey communicated with the plexus of lymph nodes located in the deep fascia of pectoralis major muscle.

== Clinical significance ==
Subareoloar lymphatic plexus is involved in the axillary spread of breast cancer to the surrounding organs.

== History ==
In 1874, the French anatomist Marie Philibert Constant Sappey discovered the subareoloar lympatic plexus by injecting mercury into the dermis of the breast of a cadaver. Sappey's description became the theoritical basis for subareolar injection for lympatic mapping of the breast.
