= Superficial lateral cervical lymph nodes =

Group of lymph nodes in the neck

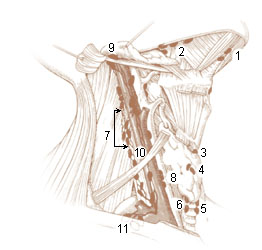
- Deep Lymph Nodes: 1. Submental; 2. Submandibular (Submaxillary); Anterior Cervical Lymph Nodes (Deep): 3. Prelaryngeal; 4. Thyroid; 5. Pretracheal; 6. Paratracheal; Deep Cervical Lymph Nodes: 7. Lateral jugular 8. Anterior jugular 9. Jugulodigastric; Inferior Deep Cervical Lymph Nodes: 10. Juguloomohyoid; 11. Supraclavicular (scalene)

Details
- System: Lymphatic system

Identifiers
- Latin: nodi lymphoidei cervicales laterales superficiales

The superficial lateral cervical lymph nodes are found along the course of the external jugular vein, between the inferior aspect of the parotid gland and the supraclavicular nodes. The nodes are intercalated along the course of the vessels draining the parotid nodes and the infraauricular nodes. These nodes drain into the supraclavicular nodes, and on to the jugular trunk, followed by the thoracic duct on the left or the right lymphatic duct.
