= Superficial anterior cervical lymph nodes =

Lymph nodes near the anterior jugular vein

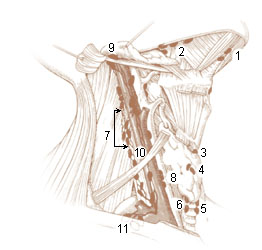
- Deep Lymph Nodes: 1. Submental; 2. Submandibular (Submaxillary); Anterior Cervical Lymph Nodes (Deep): 3. Prelaryngeal; 4. Thyroid; 5. Pretracheal; 6. Paratracheal; Deep Cervical Lymph Nodes: 7. Lateral jugular 8. Anterior jugular 9. Jugulodigastric; Inferior Deep Cervical Lymph Nodes: 10. Juguloomohyoid; 11. Supraclavicular (scalene)

Details
- System: Lymphatic system

Identifiers
- Latin: nodi lymphoidei cervicales anteriores superficiales

The superficial anterior cervical lymph nodes are found in proximity to the anterior jugular vein.
