= Deep anterior cervical lymph nodes =

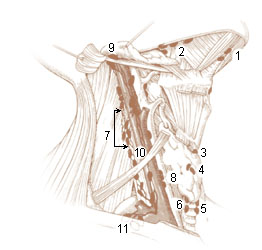
- Deep Lymph Nodes: 1. Submental; 2. Submandibular (Submaxillary); Anterior Cervical Lymph Nodes (Deep): 3. Prelaryngeal; 4. Thyroid; 5. Pretracheal; 6. Paratracheal; Deep Cervical Lymph Nodes: 7. Lateral jugular 8. Anterior jugular 9. Jugulodigastric; Inferior Deep Cervical Lymph Nodes: 10. Juguloomohyoid; 11. Supraclavicular (scalene)

Details
- System: Lymphatic system

Identifiers
- Latin: nodi lymphoidei cervicales anteriores profundi

The deep anterior cervical lymph nodes are bounded superiorly by the hyoid bone, inferiorly by the sternal notch, and are found deep to the overlying platysma muscle. These nodes drain the laryngo-tracho-thyroidal region.
