= Occipital lymph nodes =

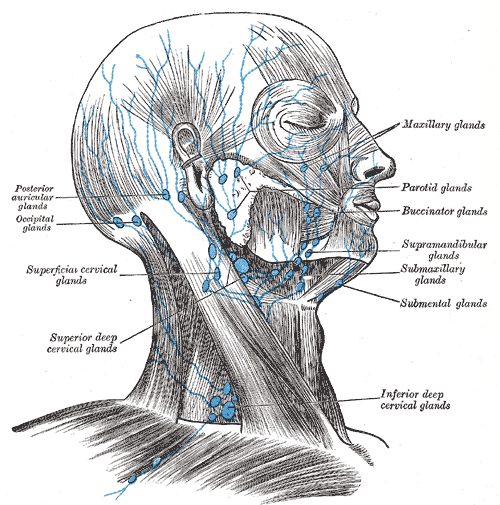
- Superficial lymph glands and lymphatic vessels of head and neck. (Occipital glands labeled at center left.)

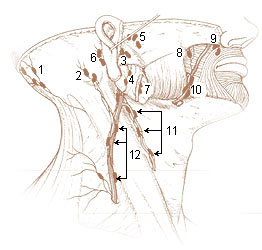
- Lymph nodes at surface: 1. Occipital (retroauricular); 2. Mastoid; 3. Superficial parotid; 4. Deep parotid; 5. Preauricular; 6. Infra-auricular; 7. Intraglandular parotid; Facial lymph nodes: 8. Buccinator; 9. Nasolabial; 10. Mandibular; 11. Anterior cervical (superficial jugular); 12. Superficial cervical (external jugular)

Details
- System: Lymphatic system
- Drains from: Scalp, occiput

Identifiers
- Latin: nodi lymphoidei occipitales
- FMA: 61214

The occipital lymph nodes are a group of 1-3 superficial lymph nodes of the head situated in the occipital region that drain part of the scalp of the occiput.

They are situated at the margin of the trapezius and resting on the insertion of the semispinalis capitis.

== Territory ==
=== Afferents ===
Afferents of occipital lymph nodes contribute to the drainage of the occipital region of the scalp (this region is also drained by a lymphatic vessel which passes along the posterior border of the sternocleidomastoid muscle to drain directly into the inferior deep cervical lymph nodes).

=== Efferents ===
Their efferents in turn drain into the superior deep cervical glands.

== Clinical examination ==
During physical examination, these nodes are examined by having the patient bend their head forward and bilaterally palpating the base of the side of the head.

== Etymology ==
The word occipital comes from the Latin: occiput ("the back of the head").
