= Superior deep cervical lymph nodes =

Lymphatic Organs

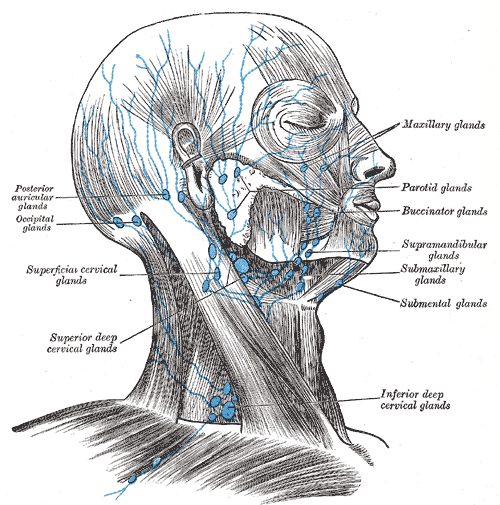
- Superficial lymph glands and lymphatic vessels of head and neck. (Superior deep cervical glands labeled at center left.)

Details
- System: Lymphatic system
- Source: Preauricular deep parotid lymph nodes
- Drains to: Inferior deep cervical lymph nodes, jugular trunk

Identifiers
- Latin: nodi lymphoidei cervicales laterales profundi superiores

The superior deep cervical lymph nodes are the deep cervical lymph nodes that are situated adjacent to the superior portion of the internal jugular vein. They drain either to the inferior deep cervical lymph nodes or into the jugular trunk.

Most of these lymph nodes are situated deep to the sternocleidomastoid muscle, though some are not. Some are situated anterior and some posterior to the internal jugular vein. They are also situated adjacent to the accessory nerve (CN XI).

== Jugulodigastric group ==
Superior deep cervical lymph nodes situated in a triangular region bounded by the posterior belly of the digastric muscle, the facial vein, and the internal jugular vein form a subgroup - the jugulodigastric group. The group consists of a single large lymph node and multiple smaller lymph nodes. It is particularly involved in the drainage of the tongue..
