= Mastoid lymph nodes =

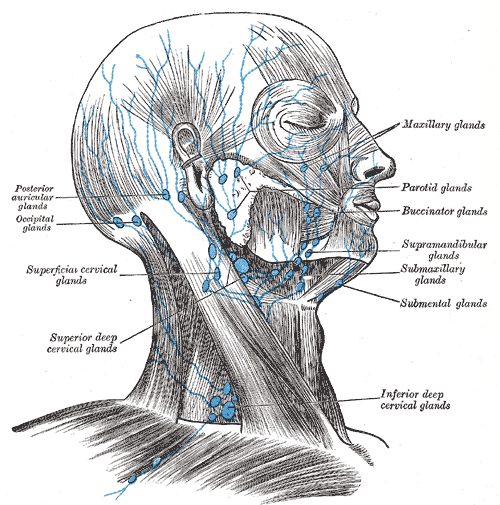
- Superficial lymph glands and lymphatic vessels of head and neck (mastoid lymph nodes are labeled as posterior auricular glands at center left)

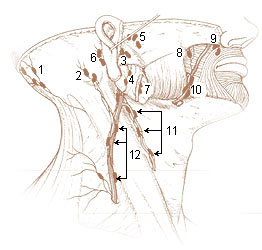
- Lymph nodes at surface: 1. Occipital (retroauricular); 2. Mastoid; 3. Superficial parotid; 4. Deep parotid; 5. Preauricular; 6. Infra-auricular; 7. Intraglandular parotid; Facial lymph nodes: 8. Buccinator; 9. Nasolabial; 10. Mandibular; 11. Anterior cervical (superficial jugular); 12. Superficial cervical (external jugular)

Details
- System: Lymphatic system
- Drains from: Scalp
- Drains to: Superior deep cervical glands

Identifiers
- Latin: nodi lymphoidei mastoidei

The mastoid lymph nodes (retroauricular lymph nodes or posterior auricular glands) are a small group of lymph nodes, usually two in number, located just beneath the ear, on the mastoid insertion of the sternocleidomastoideus muscle, beneath the posterior auricular muscle.

The mastoid lymph nodes receives lymph from the posterior part of the temporoparietal region, the upper part of the cranial surface of the visible ear and the back of the ear canal. The lymph then passes to the superior deep cervical glands.

== Etymology ==
The word mastoid comes from the Ancient Greek: μάσταξ (mástax, "mouth, jaws, that with which one chews").
