= Jugular lymph trunk =

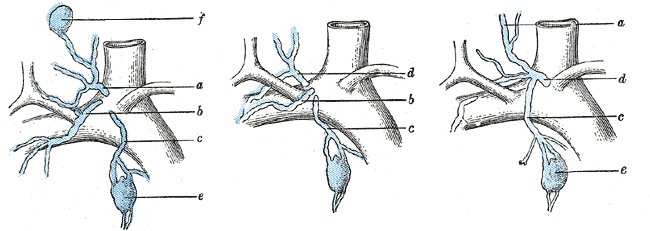
- Terminal collecting trunks of right side. a. Jugular trunk. b. Subclavian trunk. c. Bronchomediastinal trunk. d. Right lymphatic trunk. e. Gland of internal mammary chain. f. Gland of deep cervical chain.

Details
- System: Lymphatic system
- Source: Superior deep cervical lymph nodes, inferior deep cervical lymph nodes

Identifiers
- Latin: truncus jugularis
- TA98: A12.4.01.002
- FMA: 12250

The jugular trunk is a lymphatic vessel in the neck. It is formed by vessels that emerge from the superior deep cervical lymph nodes and unite to efferents of the inferior deep cervical lymph nodes.

On the right side, this trunk ends in the junction of the internal jugular and subclavian veins, called the venous angle. On the left side it joins the thoracic duct.
