= Supraclavicular lymph nodes =

Organs in the neck

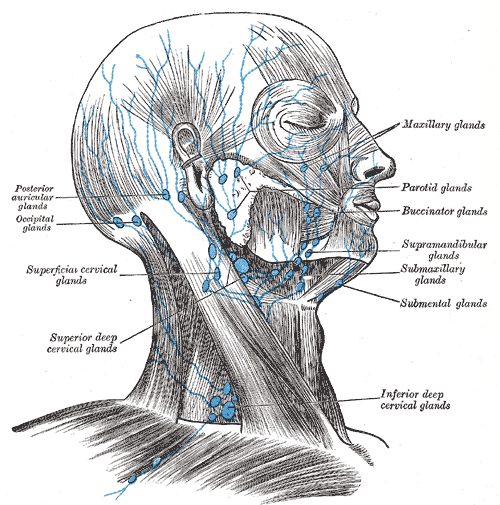
- Lymphatic vessels of the head and neck, with the supraclavicular lymph nodes described as "deep cervical lymph nodes", visible at the bottom

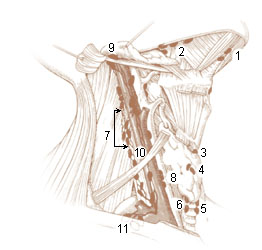
- Deep Lymph Nodes: 1. Submental; 2. Submandibular (Submaxillary); Anterior Cervical Lymph Nodes (Deep): 3. Prelaryngeal; 4. Thyroid; 5. Pretracheal; 6. Paratracheal; Deep Cervical Lymph Nodes: 7. Lateral jugular 8. Anterior jugular 9. Jugulodigastric; Inferior Deep Cervical Lymph Nodes: 10. Juguloomohyoid; 11. Supraclavicular (scalene)

Details
- System: Lymphatic system

Identifiers
- Latin: nodi lymphoidei supraclaviculares
- FMA: 14192

Supraclavicular lymph nodes are lymph nodes found above the clavicle, that can be felt in the supraclavicular fossa. The supraclavicular lymph nodes on the left side are called Virchow's nodes. It leads to an appreciable mass that can be recognized clinically, called Troisier sign.

== Structure ==
A Virchow's node is a left-sided supraclavicular lymph node.

== Clinical significance ==
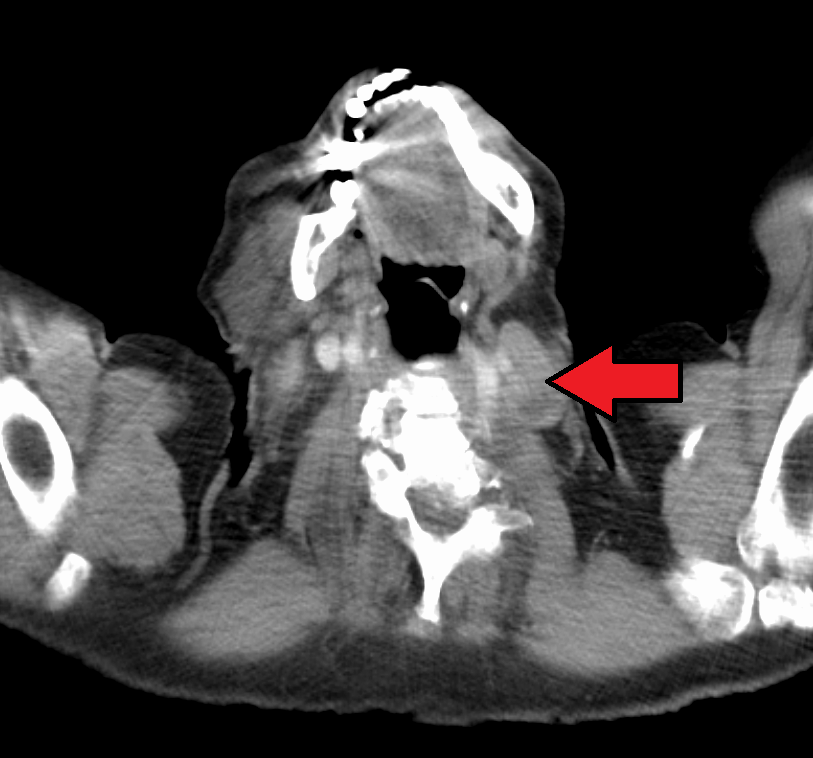
An enlarged Virchow's node as seen on CT

Malignancies of the internal organs can reach an advanced stage before giving symptoms. Stomach cancer, for example, can remain asymptomatic while metastasizing. One of the first visible spots where these tumors metastasize is one of the left supraclavicular lymph node.

Virchow's nodes take their supply from lymph vessels in the abdominal cavity, and are therefore sentinel lymph nodes of cancer in the abdomen, particularly gastric cancer, ovarian cancer, testicular cancer and kidney cancer, that has spread through the lymph vessels, and Hodgkin's lymphoma. Such spread typically results in Troisier's sign, which is the finding of an enlarged, hard Virchow's node.

The left supraclavicular nodes are the classical Virchow's node because they receive lymphatic drainage of most of the body (from the thoracic duct) and enters the venous circulation via the left subclavian vein. The metastasis may block the thoracic duct leading to regurgitation into the surrounding Virchow's nodes. Another concept is that one of the supraclavicular nodes corresponds to the end node along the thoracic duct and hence the enlargement.

Differential diagnosis of an enlarged Virchow's node includes lymphoma, various intra-abdominal malignancies, breast cancer, and infection (e.g. of the arm). Similarly, an enlarged right supraclavicular lymph node tends to drain thoracic malignancies such as lung and esophageal cancer, as well as Hodgkin's lymphoma.

== History ==
Virchow's nodes are named after Rudolf Virchow (1821–1902), the German pathologist who first described the nodes and their association with gastric cancer in 1848. The French pathologist Charles Emile Troisier noted in 1889 that other abdominal cancers, too, could spread to the nodes.

== Additional images ==
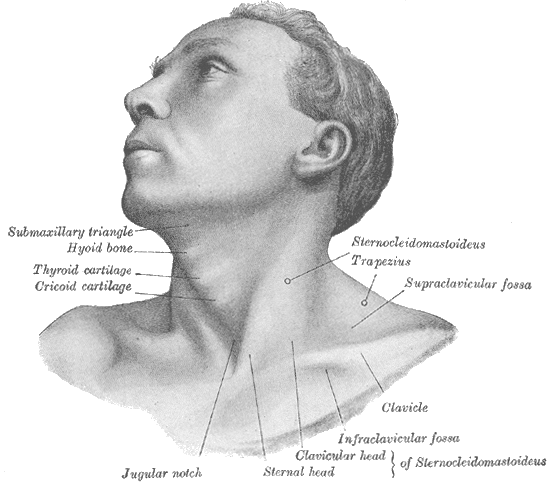
The supraclavicular lymph nodes can be felt in the supraclavicular fossa, shown here.
