= Nancy Papalopulu =

Professor of Developmental Neuroscience

Nancy Papalopulu FMedSci FRSB
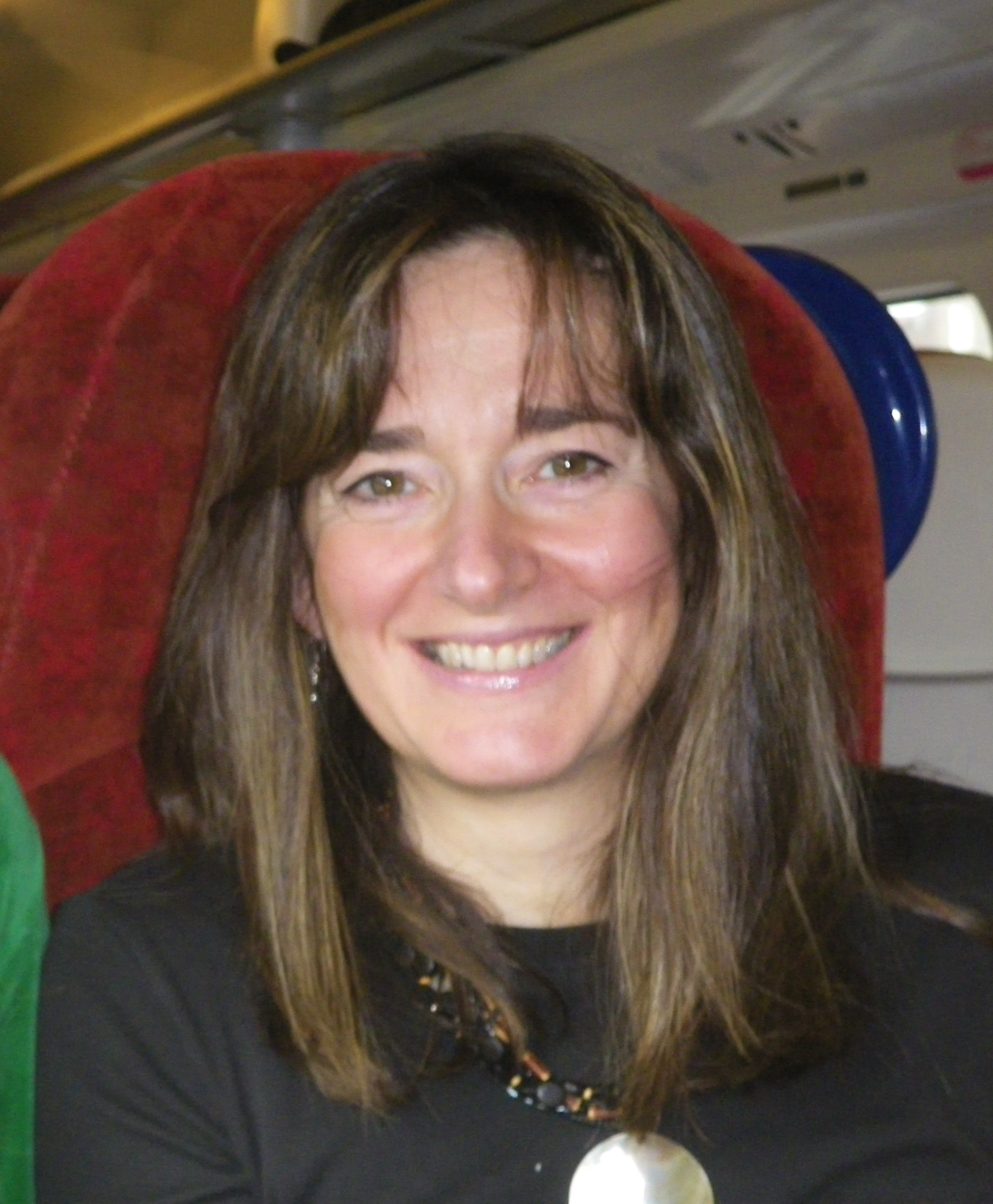
- Papalopulu in 2014
- Born: Athanasia Papalopulu; 26 March 1962 (age 64)
- Education: Aristotle University of Thessaloniki (BSc); University of London (PhD)
- Awards: EMBO Member (2012)
- Scientific career
- Fields: Developmental neurobiology
- Workplaces: University of Manchester; University of Cambridge
- Thesis: Analysis of vertebrate homeobox containing genes (1991)
- Doctoral advisor: Robb Krumlauf
- Website: papalopululab.wordpress.com

Athanasia Papalopulu (born 1962) FMedSci FRSB is a Wellcome Trust senior research fellow and Professor of Developmental Neuroscience in the School of Biological Sciences, University of Manchester.

== Education ==
After completing her undergraduate degree in Pharmacy at the Aristotle University of Thessaloniki, Greece, Nancy Papalopulu moved to London in 1986 to do a PhD at the National Institute for Medical Research, where she became one of Robb Krumlauf's first graduate students. There she studied the role of Hox genes in patterning the nervous system. She completed her PhD in 1991.

== Career and research ==
In 1991, she moved to La Jolla, California to do postdoctoral work under the supervision of Chris Kintner at the Salk Institute. There she continued to investigate factors controlling neuronal patterning in the vertebrate embryo using Xenopus as a model system. It was at this point she began to become interested in how the timing of neuronal differentiation is controlled. In 1997, Nancy was awarded a Wellcome Trust career developmental award and moved back to the UK to set up her own lab at the Gurdon Institute at the University of Cambridge to pursue this question. In Cambridge, Nancy shared lab space with Sir John Gurdon, who won the Nobel Prize in Physiology or Medicine in 2012 for his seminal work on Xenopus embryos that has underpinned our understanding of nuclear reprogramming. Her own work, and that of her lab members, focused on understanding how the cell cycle, cell polarity and location controls the balance of neuronal progenitor cell maintenance and differentiation in the developing vertebrate nervous system.

In 2006, she moved her lab to the University of Manchester, where she became research group leader of the developmental biology group in the Faculty of Life Sciences. In Manchester she has continued to investigate how the timing of neurogenesis is regulated during vertebrate development. Using computational modeling and experimental biology her group has discovered that oscillations of the microRNA miR-9 targets an important regulator of neuronal differentiation, HES1, allowing for precisely timed waves of neurogenesis. From January 2011 - January 2014, Nancy was tissue systems section head, representing developmental biology and the Wellcome Trust Centre for Cell-Matrix Research, approximately 40 research groups in the Faculty of Life Sciences. She is also an active member of the university's Women in Science group.

=== Awards and honours ===
- Researcher of the Year Award, Faculty of Life Sciences, University of Manchester, 2013
- Elected a Fellow of the Academy of Medical Sciences (FMedSci), May 2013
- Elected a member of European Molecular Biology Organisation (EMBO) May 2012
- Elected Board Member of the International Society of Differentiation, November 2012 – 2018; 6 yr term
- Elected to the British Society of Cell Biology Committee, November 2012
- Elected a Fellow of the Royal Society of Biology (FRSB), June 2011
- Elected Committee member and Executive Officer (Meetings Officer) of the British Society of Developmental Biology (BSDB), 2003–2009, overseeing the organisation of BSDB Spring and Fall Conferences.
- Wellcome Trust senior research fellow, 2000-2015 (renewed twice)
