= Jonathan Kipnis =

Neuroscientist

- יהונתן קיפניס
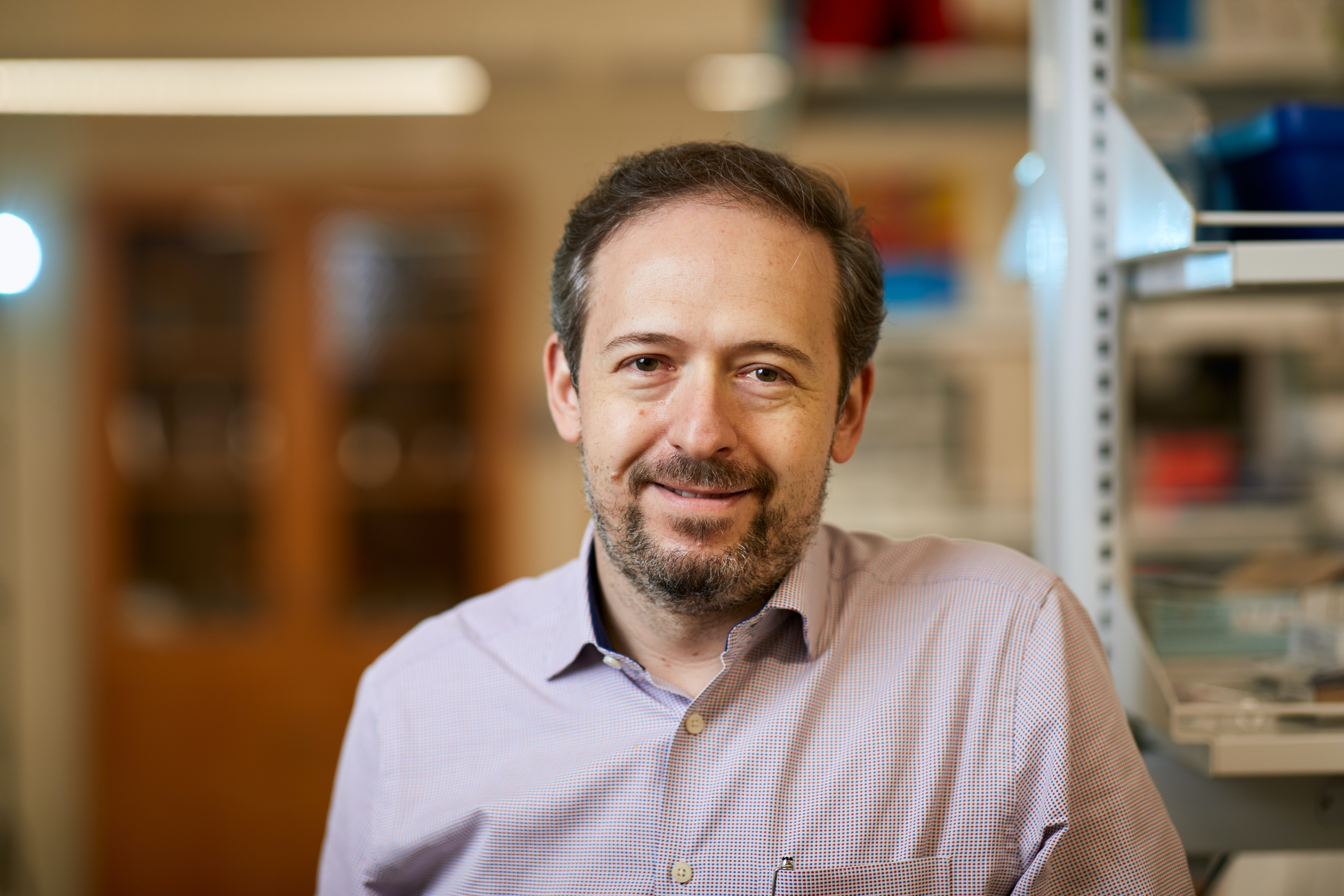
- Education: Weizmann Institute of Science, PhD; Tel Aviv University, BS
- Known for: discovery of brain lymphatic vessels
- Scientific career
- Fields: Neuroimmunology
- Workplaces: University of Virginia School of Medicine; Washington University School of Medicine
- Doctoral advisor: Michal Schwartz
- Website: Lab website

Jonathan Kipnis (Hebrew: יהונתן קיפניס) is a neuroscientist, immunologist, and professor of pathology and immunology at the Washington University School of Medicine. His lab studies interactions between the immune system and nervous system. He is best known for his lab's discovery of meningeal lymphatic vessels in humans and mice, which has impacted research on neurodegenerative diseases such as Alzheimer's disease and multiple sclerosis, neuropsychiatric disorders, such as anxiety, and neurodevelopmental disorders such as autism and Rett syndrome.

== Early life and education ==
Jonathan Kipnis was born into a Jewish family in Tbilisi, Georgia. His father and maternal grandmother were both physicians, and his mother was an academic with a focus on Russian literature and language. Surrounded by physicians, Kipnis knew from a young age that he wanted to cure diseases.

Kipnis earned an undergraduate degree in biology at Tel Aviv University in Ramat Aviv, Israel in 1998, followed by a master's degree in neurobiology at the Weizmann Institute of Science in Rehovot, Israel in 1999.

For his graduate training, Kipnis remained at the Weizmann Institute of Science. He first worked with Moshe Oren in cancer immunology, but then was inspired by Michal Schwartz to pursue a PhD in neuroimmunology. He joined Schwartz's lab the year that they discovered the therapeutic benefits of T cells in spinal cord and brain injury, a pioneering finding that launched the study of the protective roles of autoimmunity in central nervous system (CNS) disease. This was the beginning of Kipnis' career exploring the connections between the brain and the immune system.

In the Schwartz Lab, Kipnis' work focused on T cell based autoimmune reactions in CNS injury and neurodegeneration. Kipnis elucidated the pleiotropic roles of regulatory T cells in CNS injury versus CNS homeostasis. By depleting naturally occurring regulatory T cells after CNS injury, he was able to improve neuronal survival in mice. However, by up-regulating effector autoimmune T cells through immunization with CNS antigen, he was able to improve recovery after CNS injury. These results showed that the immune system's intrinsic mechanisms to protect against autoimmunity, might not be beneficial when insults demand autoimmune effector function for tissue maintenance.

Kipnis remained at the Weizmann for his postdoctoral training in Schwartz's lab. In this period he and other members of the lab, discovered that brain antigen specific T cells play a role in neurogenesis and cognitive functions, such as memory and spatial learning. This was one of the seminal findings showing that the immune system, through T cells, plays a role in cognition and brain homeostasis.

== Career and research ==
Kipnis joined the University of Virginia School of Medicine (UVA) in 2007, where he later became a Harrison Distinguished Professor and chair of the department of neuroscience. He also directed the Center for Brain Immunology and Glia (BIG Center) at UVA. In 2019, he accepted an offer to join the Washington University School of Medicine faculty via the BJC Investigators Program. He is primarily appointed in the department of pathology and immunology, and secondarily in neurology, neuroscience, and neurosurgery. Kipnis is also a Gutenberg Forschungskolleg Fellow and supervises a working group at the University of Mainz.

=== Meningeal lymphatic vessels ===
Kipnis is credited with the 2014 discovery of meningeal lymphatic vessels, a recently discovered network of conventional lymphatic vessels located parallel to the dural sinuses and meningeal arteries of the mammalian central nervous system (CNS). As a part of the lymphatic system, the meningeal lymphatics are responsible for draining immune cells, small molecules, and excess fluid from the CNS and into the deep cervical lymph nodes. While it was initially believed that both the brain and meninges were devoid of lymphatic vasculature, the 2015 Nature paper by Jonathan Kipnis and his postdoctoral fellow Antoine Louveau reporting their discovery was cited more than 3000 times by 2022

His discovery of meningeal lymphatic vessels was included in Scientific American's "Top 10 Science Stories of 2015", Science Magazine's "Breakthrough of the Year", Huffington Post's "Eight Fascinating Things We Learned About the Mind in 2015" and the National Institutes of Health's director Francis Collins year end review.

=== Cytokines and behavior ===
Other research has included the 2015 discovery that the immune system directly affects social behavior and that IFN-gamma is necessary for social development. This expands upon his work as a graduate student, when he discovered that mice lacking T-cells had cognitive impairments.

His lab also elucidated the role of meningeal gamma delta (γδ) T cells in anxiety behavior, finding that γδ T cells are resident in high numbers in the meningeal immune compartment, and that they actively transcribe the cytokine IL-17a at homeostasis. They further discovered that the release of IL-17a from γδ T cells was correlated with anxiety behavior in mice, finding high expression of IL-17a receptor in the prefrontal cortex glutamatergic neurons, and discovered that when they knocked down IL-17a receptor in cortical glutamatergic neurons, this recapitulated the anxiety phenotype in mice.

He and his group in 2015 investigated CD4+ T-cells protection and repair of neurons after injury to the spinal cord and brain. A collaboration with Kodi Ravichandran characterized the generation of neurons in adult brains and the removal of dead neurons by phagocytic cells.

In 2016, and his group identified type 2 innate lymphocytes in the meninges near the lymphatic vessels his lab previously discovered. These cells have previously have been found in the gut, which suggests a link between the brain and the microbiome. In mice, these cells were activated by IL-33 after spinal cord injury.

== Awards and honors ==
Kipnis' work has been funded by the Simons Foundation Autism Research Initiative, National Institutes of Health, the Hartwell Foundation, and the Cure Alzheimer's Fund. In 2018, he was awarded the NIH's prestigious Director's Pioneer Award and $5.6 million in additional research funding.

- 2011 Robert Ader New Investigator Award
- 2011 PsychoNeuroImmunology Research Society (PNIRS)
- 2012 Jordi Folch-Pi award, American Society for Neurochemistry
- 2014 Distinguished Research Career Development Award, University of Virginia
- 2015 Gutenberg Research College (GRC) fellowship, Johannes Gutenberg University of Mainz
- 2016 Harrison Foundation Distinguished Teaching Professorship in Neuroscience
- 2016 MIND Institute Distinguished Lecturer.
- 2018 NIH Director's Pioneer Award
- 2020 NIH/NIA MERIT Award
- 2022 Member, National Academy of Medicine

== Controversies ==
Kipnis has drawn fire for discouraging a former graduate student from reporting allegations of sexual misconduct towards her supervising post-doctoral candidate, confirmed by screenshotted text messages, and did not report the incident to Title IX investigators, stating "You don’t need [an] investigation now, even though you will most probably win." While initially covered by the Washington University student newspaper, this incident was later corroborated in an independent investigation by Stat News. Per the Stat News report, there has been controversy about the university potentially mishandling the case, evidenced by a letter from the medical school dean describing Kipnis as supportive and prompt in his response and that failure to reach out to Title IX office was the result of incorrect advice from a program administrator as well as lax enforcement of Washington University School of Medicine's mandatory reporting system.

== Select publications ==
Year	Title	Publication	Author(s)	Volume/Issue Citation
2021	Functional characterization of the dural sinuses as a neuroimmune interface	Cell	Rustenhoven J, Drieu A, Mamuladze T, de Lima KA, Dykstra T, Wall M, Papadopoulos Z, Kanamori M, Salvador AF, Baker W, Lemieux M, Da Mesquita S, Cugurra A, Fitzpatrick J, Sviben S, Kossina R, Bayguinov P, Townsend RR, Zhang Q, Erdmann-Gilmore P, Smirnov I, Lopes MB, Herz J, Kipnis J.	10.1016/j.cell.2020.12.040
2021	Skull and vertebral bone marrow are myeloid cell reservoirs for the meninges and CNS parenchyma	Science	Cugurra A, Mamuladze T, Rustenhoven J, Dykstra T, Beroshvili G, Greenberg ZJ, Baker W, Papadopoulos Z, Drieu A, Blackburn S, Kanamori M, Brioschi S, Herz J, Schuettpelz LG, Colonna M, Smirnov I, Kipnis J.	10.1126/science.abf7844
2019	Bypassing the blood-brain barrier	Science	Rustenhoven J, Kipnis J.	10.1126/science.aay0479
2018	Functional aspects of meningeal lymphatics in ageing and Alzheimer's disease	Nature	Sandro Da Mesquita, Antoine Louveau, Andrea Vaccari, Igor Smirnov, R. Chase Cornelison, Kathryn M. Kingsmore, Christian Contarino, Suna Onengut-Gumuscu, Emily Farber, Daniel Raper, Kenneth E. Viar, Romie D. Powell, Wendy Baker, Nisha Dabhi, Robin Bai, Rui Cao, Song Hu, Stephen S. Rich, Jennifer M. Munson, M. Beatriz Lopes, Christopher C. Overall, Scott T. Acton & Jonathan Kipnis.	doi:10.1038/s41586-018-0368-8
2016	Unexpected role of interferon-γ in regulating neuronal connectivity and social behaviour	Nature	Filiano AJ, Xu Y, Tustison NJ, Marsh RL, Baker W, Smirnov I, Overall CC, Gadani SP, Turner SD, Weng Z, Peerzade SN, Chen H, Lee KS, Scott MM, Beenhakker MP, Litvak V, Kipnis J.	doi:10.1038/nature18626
2015	Structural and functional features of central nervous system lymphatic vessels	Nature	Louveau A, Smirnov I, Keyes TJ, Eccles JD, Rouhani SJ, Peske JD, Derecki NC, Castle D, Mandell JW, Lee KS, Harris TH, Kipnis J.	doi:10.1038/nature14432
