= Maiken Nedergaard =

Danish neuroscientist

Maiken Nedergaard is a Danish neuroscientist most well known for discovering the glymphatic system. She is a jointly appointed professor in the Departments of Neuroscience and Neurology at the University of Rochester Medical Center. She holds a part-time appointment in the Department of Neurosurgery within the University of Rochester Center for Translational Neuromedicine, where she is the principal investigator of the Division of Glial Disease and Therapeutics laboratory. She is also Professor of Glial Cell Biology at the University of Copenhagen, Center for Translational Neuromedicine.

== Education ==
Nedergaard attended the University of Copenhagen, where she received an M.D. in 1983 and a D.M.Sc in 1988. She completed post-doctoral training in neuropathology/physiology at the University of Copenhagen (1984–1987) and subsequently in neuroscience at Weill Cornell Medicine (1987–1988).

== Research ==
In 2010, Nedergaard discovered the role of the adenosine molecule in acupuncture-induced analgesia.

In 2013, Nedergaard discovered the glymphatic system, a network of channels in the brain whose purpose is to eliminate toxins using cerebrospinal fluid (CSF). She called it the "glymphatic system" due to its dependence on glial cells. She was awarded the 2014 Newcomb Cleveland Prize for her discovery.

Subsequent research by Nedergaard and colleagues has revealed that the aquaporin-4 water channel protein plays a crucial role in modulating the flow of CSF between the perivascular space and the brain interstitium. Dysfunction of the glymphatic system has been shown to impair healing after traumatic injury and to accelerate the accumulation of toxic metabolites such as amyloid beta, implicating the glymphatic system in neurodegenerative diseases such as Alzheimer's disease, Huntington's disease, and Parkinson's disease. The glymphatic system has also been shown to interact with the recently discovered meningeal lymphatic system.

As of 2019, Nedergaard's lab focuses on neuron-glia interactions, the glymphatic system, astrocyte evolution, cerebral blood flow regulation, chronic pain, and the role of glia after stroke or spinal cord injury.

== Awards and honors ==
Nedergaard's discovery of the glymphatic system was honored as one of Science Magazine's ten "Breakthroughs of the Year" in 2013. In 2014, she accepted a Novo Nordisk Foundation Laureate Research Grant in 2014 to assist in establishing a Center for Basic and Translational Neuroscience at the University of Copenhagen. She remains affiliated with both the University of Copenhagen and the University of Rochester.

Nedergaard has received numerous individual prizes for her contributions to the study of neuron-glia interactions in health and disease:

- Elected Member, Royal Danish Academy of Sciences (2008–Present)
- Elected Member, Royal Academy of Pharmacy of Spain (2011–Present)
- Elected Member, Academia Europaea (2012–Present)
- Newcomb Cleveland Prize, AAAS (2014)
- Alzheimer Prize, Danish Alzheimer Association (2015)
- Jeppe Juhl Prize (2016)
- Olav Thon Alzheimer Prize (2016)
- Tagea Brandt Prize (2016)
- Honorary Professorship, China Medical University, Shenyang, China (2018)
- Fernström Prize (2018)
- Research to Prevent Blindness Stein Innovation Award (2018–2019)
- HFSP Nakazone Award (2024)
- Ernst Schering Prize (2024)
