= Julian Blow =

Molecular biologist

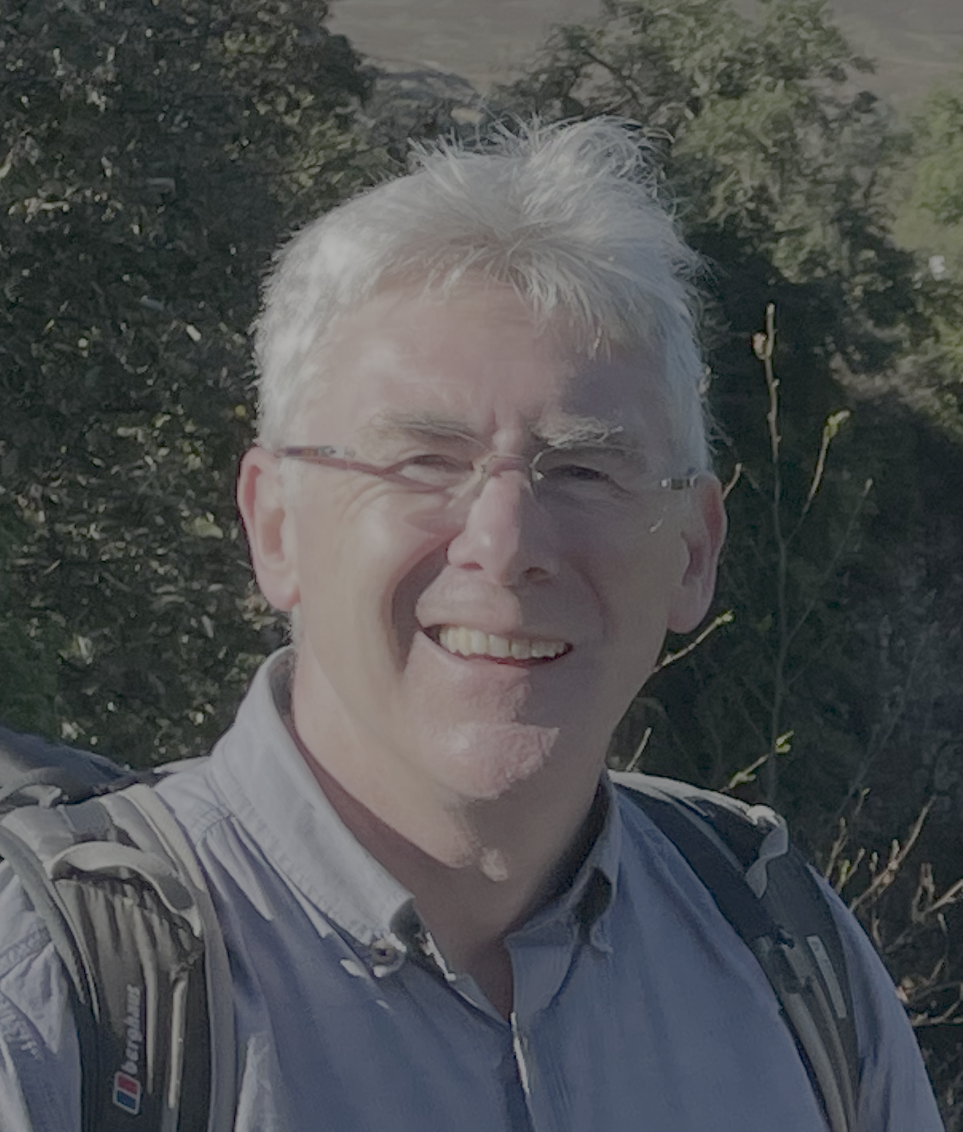
- Julian Blow
- Education: University of Edinburgh; Trinity College, Cambridge
- Known for: Chromosome maintenance
- Scientific career
- Fields: Molecular biology
- Workplaces: University of East Anglia

Julian Blow is a molecular biologist, Professor of Chromosome Maintenance, and also the Pro-Vice-Chancellor for Research and Innovation at the University of East Anglia, Norwich, England.

== Education and career ==
Blow graduated with a BSc in medical sciences from the University of Edinburgh in 1984. He then earned his PhD in DNA replication from the University of Cambridge in 1987. Following his PhD, in 1988, he worked as a postdoctoral research fellow at the University of Oxford. In 1991 he established his own laboratory at the ICRF Clare Hall Laboratories before being promoted to Senior Scientist in 1996. The following year he moved to the University of Dundee as a Principal Investigator. In 2012 he became Director of the Centre for Gene Regulation and Expression. In 2014, he was made Director of Research for the School of Life Sciences and then, in 2016, he was appointed Dean of the School of Life Sciences. In 2024 he moved to the University of East Anglia to take up the role of Pro-Vice-Chancellor for Research and Innovation.

He has served on many national and international scientific committees, including for the BBSRC, CRUK, ERC and NIH. He is currently Chair of the Scientific Committee of the Lister Institute.

== Research ==
Blow’s research focuses on understanding how chromosomes are replicated and the molecular biology behind how this is regulated. Primarily, his research investigates mechanisms that ensure the eukaryotic genome is precisely replicated during the eukaryotic cell division cycle so that no section of DNA is left un-replicated nor replicated more than once. An important part of this control involves replication origins being “licensed” early in the cell cycle to allow for replication in the upcoming S phase. This process is important in advancing our understanding of cancer, as the unchecked proliferative capacity of cancers may arise from their having lost their ability to down-regulate the licensing system. In addition to this, Blow has contributions extending to: a potential "constant" number for DNA replication robustness, methods for examining extracts from the African clawed toad (Xenopus laevis) that support cell cycle progression and a potential method for reprogramming somatic cells to a pluripotent state. As of July 2020, he has written 148 papers and has 12,141 citations on these papers.

- Biochemical and cellular effects of Roscovitine, a potent and selective inhibitor of the cyclin‐dependent kinases cdc2, cdk2 and cdk5
- Preventing re-replication of chromosomal DNA
- Inhibition of cyclin‐dependent kinases by purine analogues
- A role for the nuclear envelope in controlling DNA replication within the cell cycle
- Initiation of DNA replication in nuclei and purified DNA by a cell-free extract of Xenopus eggs
- Dormant origins licensed by excess Mcm2–7 are required for human cells to survive replicative stress
- Regulatory phosphorylation of the p34cdc2 protein kinase in vertebrates.
- Repression of origin assembly in metaphase depends on inhibition of RLF-B/Cdt1 by geminin
- Translation of cyclin mRNA is necessary for extracts of activated Xenopus eggs to enter mitosis

== Awards and honors ==
Blow has received many awards, among these being the British Association for Cancer Research / Zeneca "Young Scientist of the Year" (1996), Wellcome Trust Senior Investigator Award (2011) and in 2018, in collaboration with the Näthke lab, they were selected for a special collection of “outstanding” 2017/early 2018 Journal of Cell Biology articles focused on Stem Cells and Development. He was elected a Member of the European Molecular Biology Organization in 1999, Research Fellow of the Lister Institute Jenner-Centenary (1991-1996), Fellow of the Royal Society of Edinburgh (FRSE) in 2002, and Fellow of the Academy of Medical Sciences (FMedSci) in 2012.
