= Carol MacKintosh =

Cell and developmental biologist

- Education: University of Glasgow, PhD; University of Aberdeen, BS
- Scientific career
- Fields: Molecular signaling/Cell signaling; Cell and Developmental Biology
- Workplaces: University of Dundee
- Website: www.lifesci.dundee.ac.uk/people/carol-mackintosh

Carol MacKintosh FRSB, is a cell and developmental biologist, Professor of Molecular Signalling and Head of Postgraduate Studies, at the School of Life Sciences, University of Dundee.

== Early career and research ==
Carol MacKintosh received her education at the University of Aberdeen. She went on to do her PhD at the University of Glasgow. The PhD study focused on the branch-point between the tricarboxylic acid cycle and glyoxylate bypass in Escherichia coli, and was conducted alongside Professor Hugh Nimmo at the University of Glasgow. From 2003, Carol MacKintosh has worked at the University of Dundee and is working as a Professor of Molecular Signalling and Head of Postgraduate Studies. Her recent research focus is on how insulin regulates the 14-3-3-interacting phosphoproteome, it has provided a significant understanding into the evolution of cell signalling networks, and provided a foundation and a better understanding of how signalling networks are uncontrolled in diseases such as cancer, neurological disorders, and diabetes.

== Honours and awards ==
- Royal Society of Edinburgh Personal Fellowship (1990-1993)
- Personal Biotechnology & Biological Sciences Research Council Fellowship (1993-1999)
- The Brian Cox Award for Public Engagement: Senior Researcher (2011)
- Fellow of Society of Biology (2012)

== Publications ==
- A PKB-SPEG signaling nexus links insulin resistance with diabetic cardiomyopathy by regulating calcium homeostasis 4 May 2020 DOI: 10.1038/ s41467-020-16116-9
- SPEG Controls Calcium Re-Uptake into the Sarcoplasmic Reticulum Through Regulating SERCA2a by Its Second Kinase-Domain 1 March 2019 DOI:10.1161/CIRCRESAHA.118.313916
- Modulators of 14-3-3 Protein-Protein Interactions Journal of Medicinal Chemistry 10 May 2018 DOI: 10.1021/acs.jmedchem.7b00574 Recent advances in understanding the roles of whole genome duplications in evolution F1000Research 29-03-2018 DOI: 10.12688/ f1000research.11792
- A Tbc1d1Ser231Ala-knockin mutation partially impairs AICAR- but not exercise-induced muscle glucose uptake in mice Diabetologia 02-2017 DOI: 10.1007/s00125-16-4151-9
- Disruption of the AMPK-TBC1D1 nexus increases lipogenic gene expression and causes obesity in mice via promoting IGF1 secretion. Proceedings of the National Academy of Sciences of the United States of America 28 June 2016 DOI:10.1073/pnas.1600581113
- The E3 ubiquitin ligase ZNRF2 is a substrate of mTORC1 and regulates its activation by amino acids eLife 22 April 2016 DOI: 10.7554/ eLife.12278
- AMP-activated protein kinase FEBS Journal 2016-03-24 DOI: 10.1111/febs.13698
- Fasting and systemic insulin signaling regulate phosphorylation of brain proteins that modulate cell morphology and link to neurological disorders Journal of Biological Chemistry 2015-12-03 DOI: 10.1074/jbc.M115.668103
- ANIA: ANnotation and Integrated Analysis of the 14-3-3 interactome Tinti, M., Madeira, F., Murugesan, G., Hoxhaj, G., Toth, R. & Mackintosh, C., 2014, In : Database: the Journal of Biological Databases and Curation. 2014, 15 p., bat085.
- 14-3-3-Pred: improved methods to predict 14-3-3-binding phosphopeptides Bioinformatics 2015-03-03 DOI: 10.1093/bioinformatics/btv133 GARNL1, a major RalGAP α subunit in skeletal muscle, regulates insulin-stimulated RalA activation and GLUT4 trafficking via interaction with 14-3-3 proteins.2014-04 DOI: 10.1016/j.cellsig.2014.04.012
- Identification of 2R-ohnologue gene families displaying the same mutation-load skew in multiple cancers.2014 DOI: 10.1098/rsob.140029 Phosphoproteomics combined with quantitative 14-3-3-affinity capture identifies SIRT1 and RAI as novel regulators of cytosolic double- stranded RNA recognition pathway Öhman, T., Söderholm, S., Hintsanen, P., Välimäki, E., Lietzén, N., MacKintosh, C., Aittokallio, T., Matikainen, S. & Nyman, T. A., Oct 2014, In : Molecular & Cellular Proteomics. 13, 10, p. 2604-2617 14 p
- AS160 deficiency causes whole-body insulin resistance via composite effects in multiple tissues Chen, H-Y., Ducommun, S., Quan, C., Xie, B., Li, M., Wasserman, D. H., Sakamoto, K., MacKintosh, C. & Chen, S., 15 Jan 2013, In : Biochemical Journal. 449, 2, p. 479-489 11 p.
- Cyanobacterial microcystin-LR is a potent and specific inhibitor of protein phosphatases 1 and 2A from both mammals and higher plants C MacKintosh, KA Beattie, S Klumpp, P Cohen, GA Codd FEBS letters 264 (2), 187-192
