= Victoria Cowling =

English biologist

Victoria Haigh Cowling
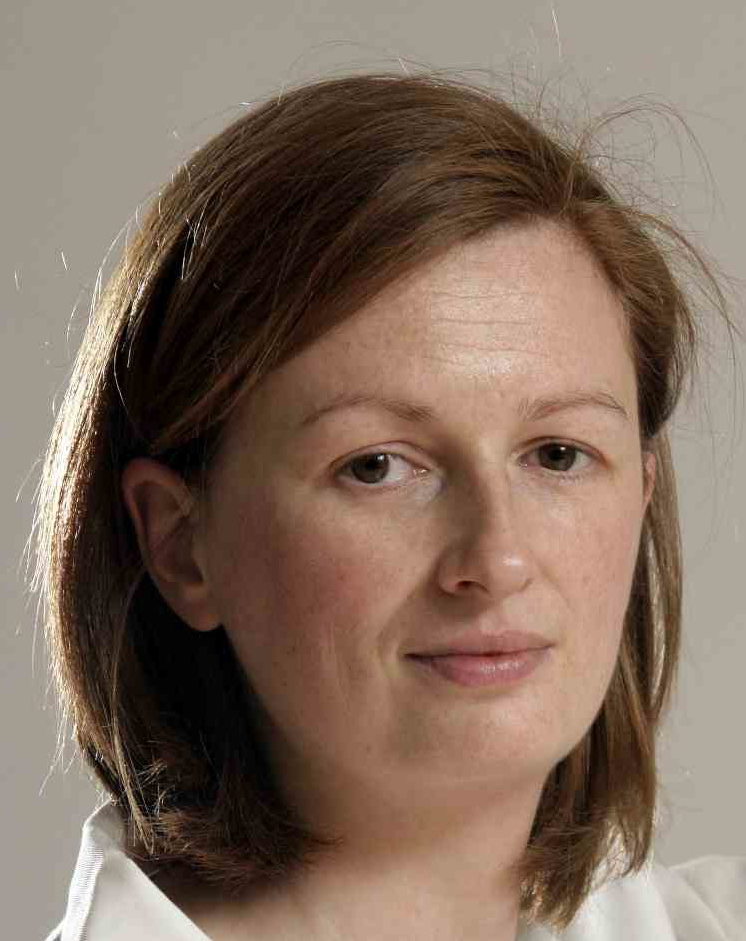
- Victoria Cowling
- Known for: Study of Transcriptional Control
- Spouse: Tristan Henderson
- Awards: Women In Cell Biology Early Career Medal
- Scientific career
- Fields: Biochemistry

Victoria Haigh Cowling FRSE is an English biologist who received the Women in Cell Biology Early Career Medal from the British Society for Cell Biology in 2014. Cowling is Professor of Biology, Lister Institute Fellow, MRC Senior Fellow and Deputy Head of The Centre for Gene Regulation and Expression at the University of Dundee.

== Education and academic career ==
Victoria Cowling studied for a BA(Hons) in Natural Sciences at Cambridge University. She moved to the Imperial Cancer Research Fund (now part of the Francis Crick Institute) and was awarded a PhD for investigating the regulation of caspase activity during programmed cell death with Gerard Evan and Julian Downward. After postdoctoral studies at Dartmouth College and Princeton University, with Mike Cole, investigating c-Myc oncogene function, Cowling set up her research group at the Division of Cell Signalling and Immunology, School of Life Sciences, University of Dundee in 2007. In 2012, she joined the MRC-Phosphorylation and Ubiquitylation Unit, and in 2015 joined The Centre for Gene Regulation and Expression.

== Research interests ==
During her postdoctoral studies at Dartmouth College, Victoria Cowling developed her interest in transcriptional control with her report that Myc can induce mRNA cap methylation. Since setting up her own group at the MRC-Phosphorylation and Ubiquitylation Unit, School of Life Sciences, University of Dundee, Cowling has continued to investigate the regulation and function of the mRNA cap, aiming to develop new therapies targeted at inhibiting tumour cell and parasite growth and proliferation.

== Professional associations and awards ==
- In 2007, Cowling was awarded an MRC Career Development Award.
- In 2011, Cowling was awarded The Lister Research Prize.
- In 2013, Cowling joined the European Molecular Biology Organisation (EMBO) Young Investigator Program.
- In 2014, Cowling was awarded an MRC Senior Non-Clinical Fellowship.
- In 2014, Cowling was awarded the Women in Cell Biology Early Career Medal from the British Society for Cell Biology.
- In 2014, Cowling was nominated for membership of AcademiaNet by EMBO.
- In 2017, Cowling was awarded an ERC consolidator grant to investigate mRNA cap regulation and function in CD8 T cells.
- In 2018, Cowling received a Royal Society Wolfson Research Merit Award.
- In 2019, Cowling was named as a Fellow of the Royal Society of Edinburgh.

== Personal life ==
Victoria Cowling is married to Tristan Henderson, a computer scientist at St. Andrews University. They have two daughters.
