= Asya Rolls =

Israeli psychoneuroimmunologist

- אסיה רולס
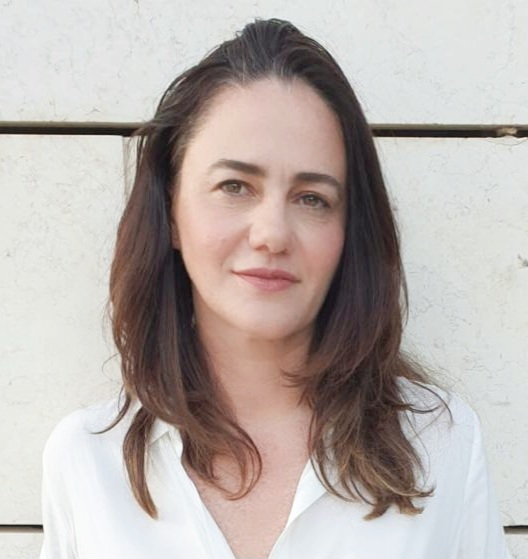
- Asya Rolls in 2020
- Born: Russia
- Education: The Hebrew Reali School in Haifa, Israel; Israel Institute of Technology; Weizmann Institute; Stanford University
- Known for: Brain representation and control of immunity and cancer
- Scientific career
- Fields: Psychoneuroimmunology
- Workplaces: Tel Aviv University
- Doctoral advisor: Michal Schwartz Ofer Lider
- Website: rolls.net.technion.ac.il

Asya Rolls (Hebrew: אסיה רולס) is an Israeli psychoneuroimmunologist and International Howard Hughes Medical Institute- Wellcome trust researcher (2018-2023). She is a Professor at the Faculty of Life Sciences in Tel Aviv University. Until 2024, she was a Professor at the Rappaport medical school at the Israel Institute of Technology. Rolls leads a lab that explores how the nervous system affects immune responses and thus physical health. Her recent work has highlighted how the brain's reward system is implicated in the placebo response and how brain-immune interactions can be harnessed to find and destroy tumors.

== Early life and education ==
Rolls was born in Russia, USSR, upon repatriation to Israel, Rolls graduated from the Hebrew Reali School in Haifa, Israel in 1993. She completed her undergraduate degree in Life Sciences at the Technion within the Israel Institute of Technology. After she obtained a Bachelors of Science, Rolls stayed in the department of Life sciences at the Israel Institute of Technology for her Master's.

Following her Master's, Rolls pursued her graduate studies at the Weizmann Institute in Israel. Rolls pursued research in neuroimmunology under the mentorship Michal Schwartz within the Department of Neuroscience and Ofer Lider in the Department of immunology. Her graduate work focused on exploring how the immune system impacts neurogenesis and brain repair. Rolls explored the role of Toll-like Receptors in neurogenesis and found that TLR2 and TLR4 play opposing roles in the proliferation of new hippocampal neurons. TLR2 seemed to promote neurogenesis and TLR4 seemed to impair neurogenesis, all through MyD88 signalling. Rolls then explored the neurogenesis in pregnancy, to understand by learning and memory impairments are common in pregnant women. Rolls completed her PhD in 2007.

== Career and research ==
In 2008, Rolls received the Fulbright Scholarship which allowed her to pursue her postdoctoral training at Stanford University in Palo Alto, California. She worked in the Department of Psychiatry under the mentorship of Luis de Lecea and Craig Heller, exploring the impact of sleep on brain homeostasis and memory. Rolls first used optogenetics to dissect the role of sleep in memory consolidation. By activating orexin neurons optogenetically, Rolls was able to fragment sleep after learning and found that this impacted memory the following day. Interestingly, the memory impairment only occurred if the minimal unit of uninterrupted sleep was below 62% of the normal. Rolls later explored the importance of sleep in fear memory consolidation. She found that specifically preventing protein synthesis during sleep caused decreases in fear memory formation highlighting the role of sleep in memory consolidation. To further show the impact that sleep can have on health, Rolls and her team explored the role of sleep in the engraftment and implantation of hematopoietic stem cells (HSCs) in mice. They found that sleep deprivation significantly decreased the expression of suppressor of cytokine signalling gene which impaired the migration and homing of HSCs. Their findings emphasized the importance of sleep in the success of bone marrow transplantation.

In 2012, Rolls was appointed to group leader at the Technion at the Israel Institute of Technology. She is now an assistant professor in the Rappaport Medical School and is the principal investigator of the Rolls Lab. Roll's lab explores the connection between the brain and the immune system. She specifically focuses on how the biological mechanisms underlying emotions and cognition affect immune function and physical health. One innovation that the Rolls Lab pioneered is the merging of DREADDs technology with CyTOyF mass-cytometry to enable the high resolution measurements of the immune system after neuronal stimulation and inhibition. Rolls is a member of The Israel Young Academy.

=== Reward system and immunity ===
Rolls was one of the first to establish the link between the brain's reward system and the immune system. Her interest in this connection came from the placebo effect. The placebo effect works from the cognitive processes generating positive expectations, but how exactly these processes lead to healing or feeling better were unknown. Rolls found that using DREADDs to activate the ventral tegmental area reward circuitry lead to an increase in the innate and adaptive immune responses in mice upon exposure to bacterial insults.

Following up this study, Rolls was interested in exploring the role of cognitive processes in tumor immunity. Since regulation of immune function is important in approaching potential treatments for cancer, Rolls explored how the brain's reward circuitry was capable of modulating tumor immunity. Strikingly, they found that using DREADDs to activate the brain's reward the circuitry lead to decreases in tumor size and that myeloid derived suppressor cells are critical to allowing the reward system to impact tumor growth.

=== Characterizing immune system in the brain ===
Rolls has pioneered the use of CyTOF mass cytometry in the characterization of immune cell populations in the brain. She and her team recently characterized previously unknown populations of T, B, Dendritic, and NK Cells in the brain using this method and found that CD44 is a common marker of infiltrating immune cells. Using CyTOF analysis, Rolls and her team found that after sleep deprivation, B cells begin to infiltrate the brain parenchyma, highlighting the impacts of sleep deprivation on the immune environment in the brain.

=== Immune memories in the brain ===
In a recent impactful study, Rolls and her team demonstrated the brain's ability to encode and retrieve inflammatory responses in an immunotypic- and anatomic-specific manner. Using activity-dependent cell labelling, she showed that neuronal ensembles in the mouse insular cortex, which were active during two different models of inflammation (colitis and peritonitis), can recapitulate the specific inflammatory response, once reactivated. Moreover, she showed that inhibition of the insular cortex was sufficient to alleviate signs of colon inflammation. These findings lay the foundation for a mechanistic explanation to psychosomatic disorders, as well as novel therapeutic avenues to treat auto-inflammatory and autoimmune diseases. Rolls later-on conceptualized a framework for neuro-immune interactions, coining the term “immunoception”, as the brain's bidirectional monitoring and control of immunity. In addition, she proposed that the physiological trace storing immune-related information, the ‘‘immunengram’’, is distributed between the brain and memory cells residing in peripheral tissues.

=== Awards and honors ===
- 2017 Howard Hughes Medical Investigator-Wellcome International Research Scholar
- 2017 Krill Prize - Wolf Foundation
- 2015-2019 FENS-Kavli Network of Excellence
- 2017 Adelis Brain Research Award
- 2010 NARSAD Young Investigator Award
- 2009 Rothschild Postdoctoral Fellowship
- 2009 Clore Foundation's Women in Science Award
- 2008 Fulbright Scholar

=== Selected media ===
- 2019 TEDx Technion - Understanding the Brain's Role in Immunity
- 2018 Scientific American Article - Could Brain Stimulation Slow Cancer?
- 2013 Scientific American Mind Article - Faulty Sleep Mechanisms Might Cause Trauma to Linger
- 2012 Nature News Article “To Sleep, Perchance to Forget Fears”
- 2011 Los Angeles Times “ Fragmented Sleep May Impair Memory, Learning”

=== Selected publications ===
- Lubianiker N., Koren T., Djerasi M., Sirotkin M., Singer N., Jalon I., Lerner A., Sar-el R., Sharon H., Shahar M., Azulay-Debby H., Rolls A. & Hendler T. (2026) Upregulation of reward mesolimbic activity and immune response to vaccination: a randomized controlled trial. Nature Medicine
- Koren T., Yifa R., Amer M., Krot M., Boshnak N., Ben-Shaanan TL., Azulay-Debby H., Zalayat I., Avishai E., Hajjo H, Schiller M., Haykin H., Korin B., Farfara D., Hakim F., Kobiler O., Rosenblum K., and Rolls A.(2021) Insular Cortex Neurons Encode and Retrieve Specific Immune Responses. Cell.
- Schiller M., Azulay-Debby H., Bushnak N., Ben Shannan T., Korin B., Koren T., Krot M., Elyahu Y., Hakim F., Rolls A.(2021) Optogenetic activation of local sympathetic innervations to the colon attenuates DSS-induced colitis. Immunity.
- Ben-Shaanan TL, Schiller M, Azulay-Debby H, Korin B, Boshnak N, Koren T, Krot M, Shakya J, Rahat MA, Hakim F & Rolls A. (2018) Modulation of anti-tumor immunity by the brain's reward system. Nature Communications
- Korin B, Dubovik T, Rolls A. (2018) Mass cytometry analysis of immune cells in the brain. Nature Protocols
- Korin B, Ben-Shaanan TL, Schiller M, Dubovik T, Azulay-Debby H, Boshnak NT, Koren T, Rolls A. (2017). High-dimensional, single-cell characterization of the brain's immune compartment. Nature Neuroscience.
- Ben-Shaanan T.L, Azulay-Debby H., Dubovik T., Starosvetsky E., Korin., Schiller M., Green NL, Admon Y., Hakim F., Shen-Orr S*., Rolls A*. (2016) Activation of the reward system boosts innate and adaptive immunity. Nature Medicine
- Rolls A., Fang W*., Ibarra i*., Bonovien P., Colas D., Heller HC,. Weissman I., de Lecea L. (2015) Sleep Regulates Hematopoietic Stem Cell Trafficking. Nature Communications (*equal)
- Rolls A., Makam M*., Kroeger D., Colas D., de Lecea L., Heller HC. (2013) Sleep to forget: context independent interference with fear during sleep. Molecular Psychiatry (*equal)
- Rolls A., Colas D, Adamantidis A, Carter M, Lanre-Amos T., Heller HC. de Lecea L. (2011) Optogenetic Disruption of Sleep Continuity Impairs Memory Consolidation. PNAS.
- Shechter R, Baruch K, Schwartz M*, Rolls A. (2010) Touch gives new life: mechanosensation modulates spinal cord adult neurogenesis. Molecular Psychiatry
- Rolls A., Shechter R.*, London A., Segev Y., Jacob-Hirsch J., Amariglio N., Rechavi G. & Schwartz M. (2008) A dual role for chondroitin sulfate proteoglycan in spinal cord repair PLoS Medicine
- Rolls A., Schori H., London A. and Schwartz M. (2008) Decrease in hippocampal neurongenesis during pregnancy. Molecular Psychiatry
- Rolls A., Shechter R.*, London A., Ziv Y., Ronen A., Levy R. and Schwartz M. (2007) Toll-like receptors modulate adult hippocampal neurogenesis. Nature Cell Biology
