= Robb Krumlauf =

American developmental biologist

- Citizenship: American
- Education: Vanderbilt University, Ohio State University
- Known for: progression in the field of developmental biology and his progression on the current understanding of Hox genes
- Scientific career
- Fields: Cell biology; developmental biology
- Workplaces: Beatson Institute for Cancer Research, Fox Chase Cancer Center, Francis Crick Institute, University of Kansas School of Medicine, University of Missouri at Kansas Dental School, Stowers Institute for Medical Research
- Doctoral students: Nancy Papalopulu

Robb Krumlauf is an American developmental biologist. He is best known for researching the Hox family of transcription factors. He is most interested in understanding the role of the Hox genes in the hindbrain and their role in areas of animal development, such as craniofacial development. Krumlauf worked with a variety of renowned scientists in the field of developmental biology throughout his time researching Hox genes.

== Early life and education ==
Robb was born in Ohio and raised in Ohio and New York. He graduated from Vanderbilt University in 1970 with a degree in chemical engineering. He later went to The Ohio State University and received his PhD in developmental biology in 1979. He has since gone on to be a researcher and professor.

== Career ==
After Krumlauf had completed his formal education, he was hired at Beatson Institute for Cancer Research along with the Fox Chase Cancer Center. In 1985, he moved to London to work at what is now known as the Francis Crick Institute. This institution is one of the most well-known biomedical research centers in the world. At the turn of the millennium, Krumlauf came back to the United States to become the founding scientific director of the Stowers Institute for Medical Research. He also is taken a professor at the University of Kansas, the University of Kansas School of Medicine, and the University of Missouri at Kansas Dental School. He is now the director emeritus of the Stowers Institute for Medical Research.

== Research ==
Krumlauf researched Hox gene complexes in both mice and Drosophila in 1989. The complexes in both species were compared in order to determine if the gene complexes between these two species may have arisen from a common ancestor. The data shows alignment of these complexes and comparable relative position of genes. This research demonstrates the relationship between Homeobox genes in Drosophila (insects) and mice (metazoans).

Krumlauf examined Hox-2 gene expression dependence on the differentiation pathway in 1991. The study shows Hox-2 gene expression has a clear reliance on the endoderm pathway the cells follow, which suggests a dependence on Hox-2 expression on the type and degree of differentiation in different cells. This publication also solidified the importance of retinoic acid on Hox-2 expression.

In 1996, Krumlauf researched the abnormal migration of motor neurons in mice that lack Hoxb-1. In this study, Krumlauf knew that the vertebrate hindbrain segments into rhombomeres, and that this was responsible for controlling the arrangement of motor neurons in the hindbrain. His research with mutant mouse embryos found that the absence of Hoxb-1 lead to changes in rhombomere 4 (r4) identity. This mutation causes a difference in migration patterns in r4, which demonstrates that Hoxb-1 is plays a role in the regulation of migratory properties of motor neurons present in the hindbrain.

Krumlauf has manipulated the expression of Hox genes in many ways throughout his career in order to observe variations in development amongst certain animals. For example, in 2013, Krumlauf and his team configured mutant animals with a double-mutant cluster of HoxA-HoxB genes in their neural crest cells. In these mutant animals, they observed a bone that resembled the dentary along with an attachment of neo-muscle. This helped Krumlauf to determine the HoxB genes are able to enhance a phenotype that was directly caused by the deletion of a HoxA cluster. This helped the research group to assess the cooperation between different clusters of Hox genes. Through the use of mutant clusters of HoxA-HoxB genes, Krumlauf and his team were able to visualize how the suppression of one of the Hox genes, with amplification of another type of Hox genes, can be critical in the proper development of an animal. The example shown in this study was the variation in craniofacial development when certain Hox genes are suppressed.

In 2014, Krumlauf examined Hox gene expression in comparison to hindbrain segmentation. Gnathostomes were used in this research in an attempt to determine how primitive the relationship between Hox gene expression and segmentation of the hindbrain is. The data concluded that there is clear correlation between Hox expression and hindbrain segmentation. The use of gnathostomes shows this trait to be ancient, with origin at the base of vertebrates.

Krumlauf is best known for his progression in the field of animal developmental biology and his progression on the current understanding of Hox genes. Hox genes are known for laying out the basic body structures of a wide variety of animals. Hox genes control a variety of regulatory interactions in the hindbrain which leads to segmentation in animals.^{[5]} After many years of research on the importance of Hox genes through manipulation trials, Krumlauf studied the variations of Hox genes between vertebrates and invertebrates in 2017. He notes that Hox gene expression was found in even the most primitive vertebrates, such as the sea lamprey. This Hox gene expression has been maintained across phylogenetically dissimilar vertebrates. However, this is not the case for invertebrates. Krumlauf studied the Hox genes present in chordates and found these invertebrates to lack hindbrain segmentation. He did find that chordates still had conserved some of the aspects of the Hox gene network. This includes things such as the use of retinoic acid in establishing Hox-gene domains.

Krumlauf's publications can be used to better understand the role of Hox genes within many species of animals. His research has also helped to express the importance of suppression and regulation of individual Hox genes.

== Additional publications ==
"Patterning the vertebrate neuraxis" (1996) This publication examines segmentation and long-range signaling from organizing centers to interpret the role these principles play in the patterning of a vertebrate neuraxis.

"Organization of the Fugu rubripes Hox clusters: evidence for continuing evolution of vertebrate Hox complexes" (1997) This investigation seeks to observe the Hox clusters present in a teleost fish, Fugu rubripes. Four different Hox complexes were discovered within Fugu rubripes. The data shows the Hox clusters in Fugu to be widely variant with respect to length. At least nine genes in the Hox complex has been lost in Fugu when compared to present mammalian complexes. This data demonstrates that gene loss of prototypical Hox clusters is a defining feature in both tetrapod and fish evolution.

"'Shocking' developments in chick embryology: electroporation and in ovo gene expression" (1999) This paper focuses on new approaches to the analysis of gene expression through the use of electroporation. This work focuses on the protocol for electroporation, how it can be applied to differing organisms, and the future experiments that could be conducted through the use of electroporation.

== Awards and honors ==
- 1975 NIH Pre-Doctoral Fellow
- 1979 NATO/NSF Postdoctoral Fellow
- 1982 NIH Postdoctoral Fellow
- 2003 American Academy of Arts & Science Member
- 2007 American Association for Advancement of Science Fellow
- 2016 National Academy of Sciences Member
- 2018 Edwin G. Conklin Medal Recipient
