= Protective autoimmunity =

Protective autoimmunity is a condition in which cells of the adaptive immune system contribute to maintenance of the functional integrity of a tissue, or facilitate its repair following an insult. The term ‘protective autoimmunity’ was coined by Prof. Michal Schwartz of the Weizmann Institute of Science (Israel), whose pioneering studies were the first to demonstrate that autoimmune T lymphocytes can have a beneficial role in repair, following an injury to the central nervous system (CNS). Most of the studies on the phenomenon of protective autoimmunity were conducted in experimental settings of various CNS pathologies and thus reside within the scientific discipline of neuroimmunology.

== Background ==
The adaptive immune system primarily consists of T and B lymphocytes, which can respond to specific antigens and subsequently acquire an immunological memory. The activity of adaptive immunity is critically important for host defense against pathogens. Cells of the adaptive immunity that respond to self-antigens are termed ‘autoimmune cells’. Autoimmunity, the activity of autoimmune cells, is generally considered in the context of an autoimmune disease—a pathological condition induced by an overwhelming activity of autoimmune cells. One of the hallmarks of immunity is the ability to transfer a substantial amount of lymphocytes or antibodies from one animal to another in a way that results in immunity to a certain pathogen (adaptive transfer). Similarly, autoimmune diseases can be induced experimentally by the adaptive transfer of autoimmune cells or antibodies from an animal that suffers from an autoimmune disease into a healthy animal. In a seminal study of 1999, Schwartz and colleagues demonstrated that the same autoimmune T cells that can cause an experimental autoimmune encephalomyelitis (EAE, a common model for multiple sclerosis) can also be harnessed to protect injured CNS tissue from secondary degeneration following a traumatic insult. The experiment showed that after a partial crush injury of the optic nerve, rats injected with activated T cells which are specific for myelin basic protein (MBP, a common protein in the CNS) retained 3-fold more retinal ganglion cells with functionally intact axons than did rats injected with activated T cells specific for other (control) antigens. These findings indicated that at least under certain circumstances, autoimmune activity could exert a beneficial effect by protecting injured neurons from the spread of damage. Additional work by the Schwartz group has shown that protective autoimmunity is a naturally occurring physiological phenomenon that takes place spontaneously following a CNS injury. Mutant mice which lack T cells (such as SCID and nude), and mice that lack T cells that can recognize CNS antigens, exhibit reduced levels of neuronal survival following CNS injury relative to normal (wild type) mice. On the other hand, mice that were genetically engineered so that most of their T cells will recognize a CNS antigen—such as transgenic mice overexpressing a T cell receptor (TcR) for MBP—exhibit elevated rates of neuronal survival after CNS injury. Experiments conducted in animal models of spinal cord injury, brain injury, glaucoma, stroke, motor neuron degeneration, Parkinson’s and Alzheimer's disease have demonstrated the relevance of immune cells and in particular T cells that recognize CNS antigens in promoting neuronal survival and functional recovery from acute and chronic neurodegenerative conditions. T cells that recognize CNS antigens have also been shown to be important for maintaining the functional integrity of the adult CNS under normal non-pathological conditions. Immune deficient mice and mice which lack T cells that recognize brain antigens exhibit impairments in spatial learning and memory, and have reduced levels of cell renewal in the hippocampus and sub-ventricular zone (the brain structures where neurogenesis takes place in the adult brain).

== Mechanism of action ==
An immune response that takes place following CNS injury elicits a cascade of molecular and cellular events that can eventually affect the organism’s functional recovery. Immediately after an injury to the CNS, there is a local innate immune response. This response is mediated primarily by microglia cells, a population of CNS-resident immune cells, which can act as phagocytes, and antigen-presenting cells. CD4+ T helper cells that were specifically activated by antigens associated with the lesion, arrive at the site of injury and locally interact with microglia and other blood-derived antigen presenting cells (e.g. dendritic cells). Local properties of antigen presenting cells (i.e. the levels of MHC-II-self antigen complexes and the type of co-stimulatory molecules) dictate the profile of the subsequent T cell response. The interaction between the T cells and the microglia/dendritic cells results in the production of a set of inflammatory cytokines (such as interferon gamma) and chemokines (chemoatractant proteins) that, in turn, orchestrate the ensuing repair process in which many cell types participate. Microglia and myeloid cells recruited from the circulating blood restrict the spread of damage by buffering excessive levels of toxic self-compounds (such as the neurotransmitter glutamate), and by producing growth factors (such as insulin-like growth factor-1) that prevent neuronal death and induce axonal re-growth. In addition, the chemokines produced at the site of injury attract endogenous stem or progenitor cells that can further contribute to repair by providing a source for new neurons and glial cells, and by restricting the local immune response.

The mechanism by which protective autoimmunity maintains the brain’s functional integrity under non-injurious conditions is still not known. One model suggests that CNS-specific autoimmune T cells which constantly circulate through the cerebrospinal fluid (CSF) interact with perivascular dendritic cells that reside at the choroid plexus and meninges. Cytokines and growth factors secreted into the CSF by the T cells and dendritic cells then diffuse into the neural parenchyma were they locally affect neurons, glial cells and stem cells. This model infers that the level of antigen presentation (i.e. the amount of MHC-II-self antigen complexes) serves as an indicator of the level of immune activity required for maintenance of the uninjured brain.

== Regulation ==
The outcome of autoimmune activity is determined by several factors, namely: the intensity, the location, and the duration of the autoimmune response. For an autoimmune response to be beneficial, its intensity, duration and site of activity must be tightly regulated. Although autoimmune T cells exist in all healthy individuals, a relatively small portion of the population develops autoimmune diseases. This is due to various mechanisms that constantly regulate the activity of autoimmune cells. One of the prominent autoimmune regulatory mechanisms is a sub-population of T cells called ‘regulatory T cells’ (previously known as ‘suppressor T cells’), which restrict autoimmune activity. Experiments in animal models of CNS injury have shown that depletion of regulatory T cells allows an enhanced neuroprotective autoimmune response to take place after the insult. Importantly, however, such an experimental manipulation can at the same time increase the susceptibility to development of an autoimmune disease. Under certain conditions, an initially protective autoimmune response can reach a tipping point, after which it will have a detrimental effect on the tissue, and might even develop into an autoimmune disease. Both genetic and environmental factors (such as infection) can underlie such a transition from a neuroprotective autoimmune response into an overwhelming and detrimental autoimmune disease.

Other cell types, such as B cells and even neural progenitor cells, can promote regulation of immune response in the CNS. Stem and progenitor cells are usually regarded with respect to their potential to serve as a source for newly differentiated cells, but recently stem and progenitor cells have also been acknowledged for their ability to modulate immune activity. Experiments have shown that injection of neural progenitor cells into the brain’s ventricles can modulate an immune response taking place at multiple inflammatory foci in a mouse model of multiple sclerosis, or at a single site at the injured spinal cord.

== Therapeutic implications ==
The concept of protective autoimmunity is relatively new, and it has been shadowed by the historic and yet dominant view of autoimmunity as a damaging factor. Skepticism towards protective autoimmunity has been further fueled by the general concept of the CNS as being an immune privileged site in which immune cell activity is observed only under pathological conditions. Nevertheless, studies during the last decade have established that the immune system has the capacity to orchestrate a multitude of beneficial effects in the adult CNS under both normal and pathological conditions. Such effects range from the molecular level (growth factor production, buffering of toxic self compounds) through the cellular level (induction of axonal regrowth and neurogenesis) to the behavioral level (maintenance of spatial memory).

Several approaches have been used experimentally in order to harness naturally occurring immune cell activity in CNS pathologies. Here are key examples:

1. Therapeutic vaccination: This approach utilizes a common immunological manipulation. Inoculation of an antigen that is associated with the pathology, in this case the site of injury, evokes the activation and proliferation of lymphocytes which can specifically respond to the antigen used. For therapeutic purposes, vaccination with an antigen associated with the site of injury (for example peptides derived from myelin proteins) is problematic, because it carries the risk of inducing, in individuals susceptible to autoimmune diseases, an overwhelming inflammatory response that is detrimental for recovery. To circumvent this problem researchers have been using lower affinity agonists (termed ‘altered peptide ligands’) which induce a weaker immune response. Experiments in animal models of spinal cord injury revealed that the use of such altered peptide ligands is effective in promoting functional recovery without the risk of inducing a deleterious autoimmune response.

2. Alteration of regulatory T cell activity: Suppressing regulatory T cell activity following injury can allow a more robust autoimmune response to take place. For therapeutic purpose, the mere removal of regulatory T cells is, again, highly problematic because it increases the risk of inducing autoimmune diseases. Overcoming this limitation is possible using agents that transiently suppress regulatory T cell activity. Such an agent has been used successfully in an animal model of ischemic stroke, where treated animals exhibited improved neurological recovery relative to non-treated animals.

== See also ==
- List of autoimmune diseases
- Cancer immunotherapy
