= Michal Schwartz =

Professor of neuroimmunology

- מיכל שוורץ
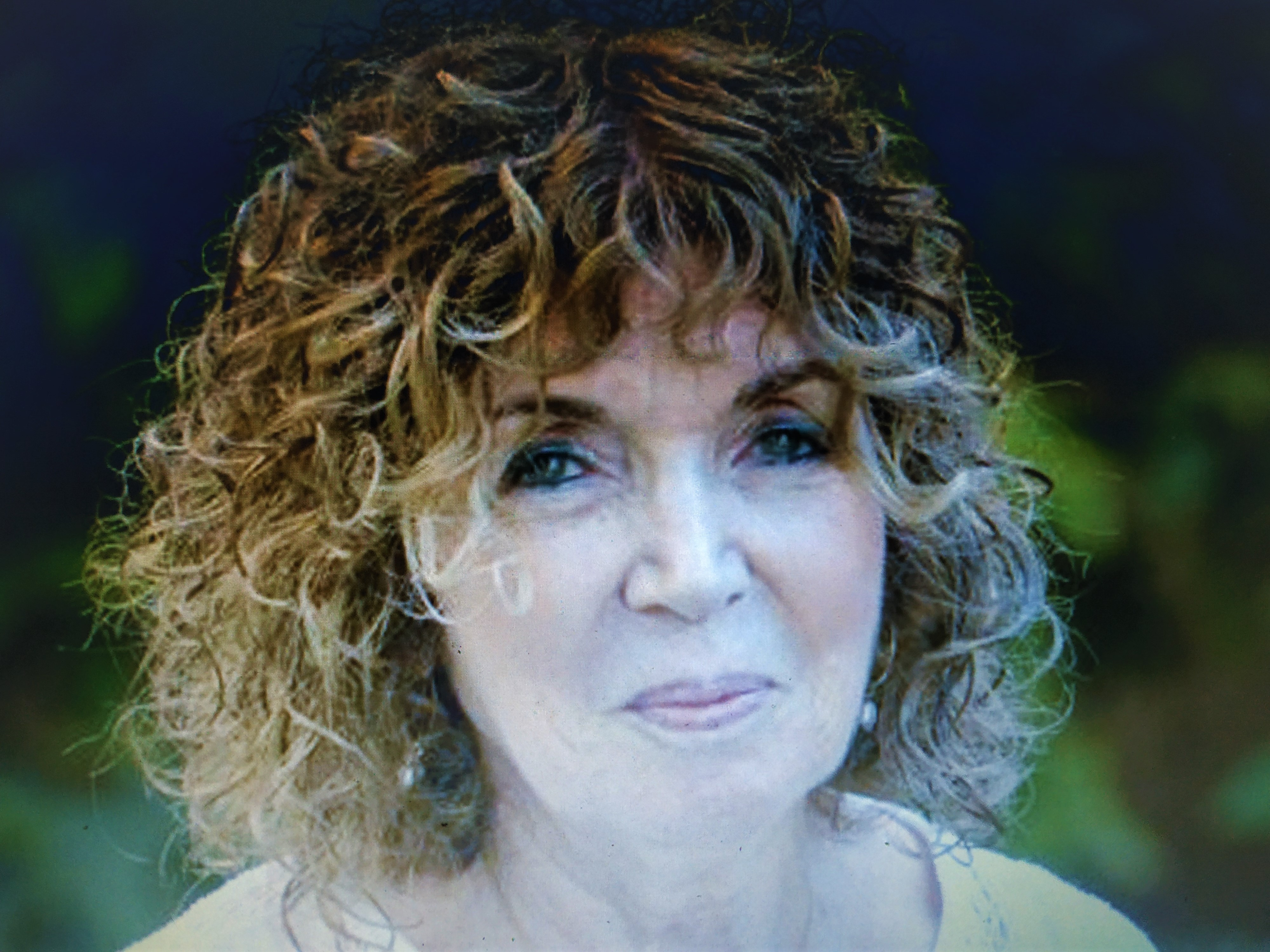
- Born: 1 January 1950 (age 76); Tel Aviv, Israel
- Scientific career
- Fields: Neuroimmunology
- Workplaces: Weizmann Institute of Science
- Doctoral students: Jonathan Kipnis; Jasmin Fisher; Asya Rolls
- Website: www.weizmann.ac.il/neurobiology/labs/schwartz

Michal Schwartz (Hebrew: מיכל שוורץ; born 1 January 1950) is a professor of neuroimmunology at the Weizmann Institute of Science. She is active in the field of neurodegenerative diseases, particularly utilizing the immune system to help the brain fight terminal neurodegenerative brain diseases, such as Alzheimer's disease and dementia.

Schwartz's studies have shown that the immune system supports a healthy brain's function and is vital for healing and protecting the brain in case of injury or disease.

Schwartz coined the term protective autoimmunity and discovered roles for immune cells in repair and neurogenesis. She has been the elected chair of the International Society of Neuroimmunology (ISNI) since 2016.

In 2023 Schwartz received the Israel Prize for Life Sciences.

== Education ==
Schwartz gained her Bachelor of Science in chemistry at the Hebrew University of Jerusalem in 1972. She received her Ph.D. in immunology in 1977 at the Weizmann Institute of Science, where she would later spend the majority of her career. She also spent time at the University of Michigan, Ann Arbor, researching nerve regeneration.

== Career and research ==
At the Weizmann Institute, she progressed from senior scientist in the Department of Neurobiology to full professor in 1998, and was then awarded the Maurice and Ilse Katz Professorial Chair in Neuroimmunology in 2016. Schwartz's work in neuroimmunology has encompassed a wide range of pathologies in the central nervous system (CNS), including injury, neurodegeneration, mental dysfunction, and aging. She coined the term protective autoimmunity and demonstrated the role of immune cells such as macrophages and T cells in spinal cord repair. She also identified specific brain areas for 'cross talk' between the CNS and the immune system. This cross-talk is important for recruiting immune cells and maintaining a healthy brain, and the disruption of this cross-talk can play a role in brain aging and neurodegenerative disease. She also showed this role in pregnancy and fetal brain development, where immune disruption in the mother can be linked to neurodevelopmental disorders in their children. Another focus of her work has been on repurposing cancer immunotherapies such as PD-1 blockers to treat neurodegenerative disorders, such as Alzheimer's disease.

=== Macrophages ===
The Schwartz team discovered that bone marrow-derived macrophages are needed for central nervous system (CNS) repair. The brain-resident myeloid cells (the microglia), and infiltrating monocyte-derived macrophages are not redundant populations, despite their myeloid phenotype, and display distinct functions in resolution of brain inflammation.

=== Autoimmunity ===
In her research, Schwartz discovered that the ability to cope with sterile CNS injuries requires support in the form of an adaptive immune response mediated by CD4+ T cells that recognize CNS antigens. She coined the concept of protective autoimmunity, to distinguish this response from autoimmune disease, in which the anti-self response escapes control. Over the years, it became clear that adaptive immunity is needed to facilitate the recruitment of immunoregulatory cells, including bone marrow-derived macrophages and FoxP3 regulatory T cells, though the balance between regulatory T cells and effector memory cells is different in the periphery versus the brain.

=== Brain Homeostasis ===
Schwartz's team discovered the role of adaptive systemic immune cells, and specifically T cells recognizing brain antigens (Protective autoimmune T cells), in supporting the cognitive capacity of the healthy brain, for lifelong neurogenesis, and functional brain plasticity. These observations paved the way for numerous additional discoveries in which the brain-immune axis was described.

=== The Choroid Plexus ===
Schwartz's team identified the brain's choroid plexus (CP) within the blood-cerebrospinal fluid barrier as an immunological interface between the brain and the immune system. It serves as a niche that hosts immune cells, and as a physiological entry gate for leukocytes. Focusing on this unique niche within the brain led the Schwartz group to propose that IFN-γ holds the key to regulating CP gateway activity. Her team further showed that in brain aging and neurodegenerative diseases (studied using both mouse models and human samples), dysfunction of this interface is determined both by signals originating in the brain, and signals from the aged immune system, which led to the identification of Type-I Interferon (IFN-I) at the CP as a negative player, affecting the fate of the aging brain in general, and of microglia, in particular. A similar IFN-I signature at the CP was subsequently discovered by others in Alzheimer's disease and in the postmortem brains of infected patients who died from COVID-19.

=== Immunotherapy ===
The discovery that adaptive immunity plays a key role in brain function and repair, the need for bone marrow-derived macrophages to resolve local brain inflammation, the fact that Alzheimer's disease (AD) and all forms of dementia are mainly age-related diseases, and the fact that the immune system is particularly affected by aging all led Schwartz to propose a new treatment for combating dementias. Schwartz suggested empowering systemic immunity, using a form of immunotherapy by modestly blocking the inhibitory immune checkpoint PD1/PD-L1 pathway. This treatment drives an immune-dependent cascade of events, that allows the harnessing of bone marrow-derived macrophages and regulatory T cells to help clear toxic factors from the diseased brain, and to arrest the local inflammation, thereby providing a comprehensive multi-factorial therapy through modification of multiple elements that go awry in AD. Schwartz's patents for developing such immunotherapy for AD are licensed to a small Biopharma company, Immunobrain Checkpoint. The company is awaiting a clinical trial in AD patients, supported in part by the National Institute of Aging, the US National Institutes of Health, and The Alzheimer's Association.

=== Students ===
Schwartz has mentored approximately 40 Ph.D. students, and approximately 39 MSc students. Her former Ph.D. students include Jonathan Kipnis, Noga Ron Harel, Jasmin Fisher, Asya Rolls.
