= Jasmin Fisher =

British biologist

Jasmin Fisher FRSB
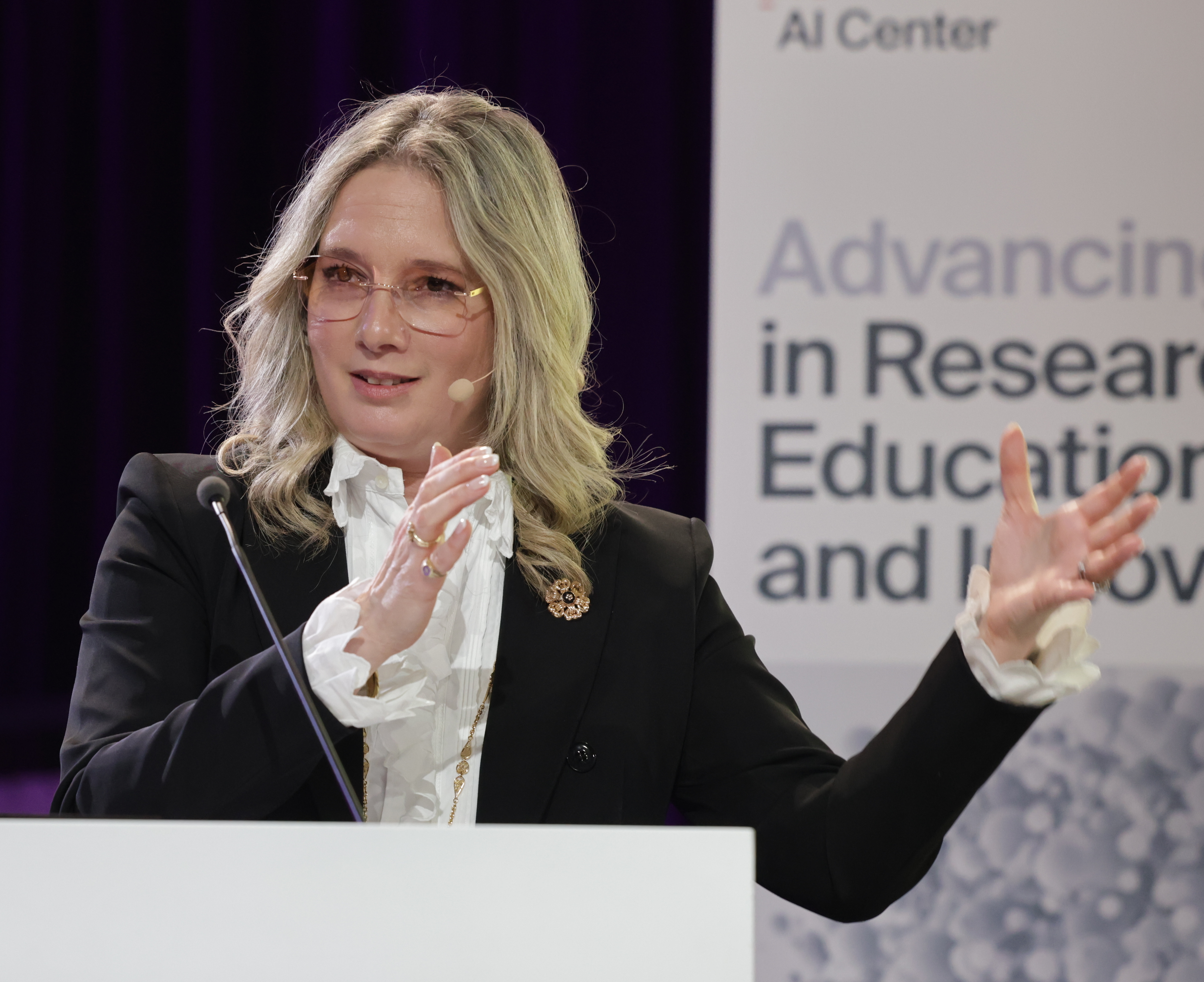
- Fisher speaking in 2024
- Born: Jasmin Fisher; 22 April 1972 (age 54)
- Education: Weizmann Institute of Science (PhD)
- Scientific career
- Fields: Computational modelling Signalling networks Cancer; Therapeutics
- Workplaces: Weizmann Institute of Science; École Polytechnique Fédérale de Lausanne; University of Cambridge; Microsoft Research; University College London
- Thesis: Insights into the mechanisms underlying T cell-mediated neuroprotection in injured central nervous system tissue (2003)
- Doctoral advisor: Michal Schwartz
- Website: www.ucl.ac.uk/medical-sciences/divisions/cancer/our-research/computational-cancer-biology

Jasmin Fisher (born 1972) FRSB, is an Israeli-British biologist who is Professor of computational biology at University College London. She is Group Leader of the Fisher Lab at UCL Cancer Institute, which develops state-of-the-art computational models and analysis techniques to study cancer evolution and mechanisms of drug resistance to identify better personalised treatments for cancer patients.

== Education ==
Fisher was educated at Ben-Gurion University of the Negev, Israel, graduating with a B.Sc. in Biology and M.Sc. in Physiology and Biophysics in 1998. In 2003 she completed her PhD in Neuroimmunology supervised by Michal Schwartz at the Weizmann Institute of Science. Her doctoral research investigated the mechanisms underlying T-cell mediated neuroprotection in injured central nervous system tissue.

== Research and career ==
Following her PhD, Fisher started her pioneering work as a postdoctoral research fellow on the application of formal verification methods to analyse executable mechanic models of cellular processes, first with David Harel at the Weizmann Institute and subsequently with Thomas Henzinger at the École Polytechnique Fédérale de Lausanne, Switzerland.

From 2007 to 2019, Fisher joined the Microsoft Research Lab in Cambridge, England, becoming Principal Researcher. During this period she was also associate professor in the Department of Biochemistry at University of Cambridge where she was Group Leader.

Fisher led development of an innovative approach, which she named Executable Biology, to simulate and analyse biological mechanisms as if they were computer programs. This approach is highly effective in gaining new biological insights, and discovering new combination therapies for cancer and how best to target them. Practical applications include improved therapies for Acute Myeloid Leukaemia (joint work with Astra Zeneca) and Breast Cancer. Fisher's lab also used executable models to address the challenge of COVID-19, to predict effective repurposed drugs for early and late-stage treatment, identifying nine new drug combinations.

While at Microsoft Research, with corporate support and endorsement, Fisher and her team developed a software tool for research, teaching and drug discovery, the BioModelAnalyzer (BMA). It was released as open source software by Microsoft under an MIT Licence. BMA provides visual input and editing of executable biology models, data integration and has powerful analysis capabilities. It has a user-friendly interface designed to be accessible to non-computing experts, biologists and clinicians, as well as for drug discovery in the biotech and big pharma sectors.

In 2019 Fisher moved her Lab to University College London Cancer Institute. Here, her multi-disciplinary team works closely with experimental cancer biologists and clinicians. Research is focussed on understanding how cancers evolve through the identification of molecular mechanisms that underpin cell-fate decision programs during both normal development and disease.

Fisher has a strong personal commitment to promoting women in STEM. This includes: setting up a mentoring and discussion group for women, mentoring early and mid-career women in academia, delivering a series of talks to UK senior schools to increase the visibility of women in science and act as a role model to women in STEM, participating in panel discussions on gender equality to raise the profile of women in STEM, and publishing an article on inclusion policies in academia together with Sarah Teichmann and Muzlifah Haniffa in Nature Communications 2022.

== Honours and awards ==
Fisher has received numerous awards and was elected a Fellow of the Royal Society of Biology (FRSB) in 2018. She was named one of the top 50 outstanding leaders in the UK healthcare by BioBeat in 2017. Fisher was a Fellow of Trinity Hall, Cambridge from 2016 to 2019. She was awarded the Dov Biegun Postdoctoral Fellowship at Weizmann Institute of Science (2003-2006), the Dean's Award for Excellence in PhD Studies, Weizmann Institute of Science (2001) and the Marton and Toby Mower Fellowship for Excellence in PhD Studies, Weizmann Institute of Science (1999-2000). Fisher also received the Zlotowski Center Award for Excellence and the Life Sciences Fellowship for Excellence from Ben-Gurion University (1997).
