= Kodi Ravichandran =

American immunologist

Kodimangalam S. Ravichandran is a U.S. immunologist and a leading researcher in the area of how we remove billions of dying cells in the body on a daily basis, and how such dead cell removal impacts many human inflammatory diseases (such as arthritis, airway inflammation, and colitis). Dr. Kodi Ravichandran obtained his degree in Veterinary Medicine from Madras Veterinary College (Chennai, India) in 1987. During the last two years of Veterinary School, he became interested in the molecular biology of cellular processes, and how specific drugs function at a molecular level. This led to his pursuing a PhD in Molecular and Cell Biology at the University of Massachusetts at Amherst in the United States. For his doctoral work, he addressed how temporal gene expression and antibody specificities contribute toward the repertoire of B lymphocytes in various lymphoid organs in mice. Dr. Ravichandran then moved to at Dana–Farber Cancer Institute (Boston, MA) to pursue his post-doctoral research under the guidance of Dr. Steven Burakoff. Here, he focused on intracellular signaling in T cells, and addressed the role of adapter proteins (particularly Shc), and published multiple high impact publications (1992-1996). He was also an instructor at Harvard Medical School.

In 1996, Dr. Ravichandran moved to the University of Virginia School of Medicine (Charlottesville, VA) as Assistant Professor to establish his independent laboratory. He was promoted to Professor (2004) and is currently the Harrison Distinguished Professor of Microbiology. Since 2010, he has been the Chair of the Department of Microbiology, Immunology, and Cancer Biology. Dr. Ravichandran has also been directing the Center for Cell Clearance since 2008 (a collaborative effort across UVa). He received the State of Virginia Governor's Award for Science Innovation in 2011. and was awarded the Robert J. Kadner Mentoring Award for outstanding training of graduate students and post-doctoral fellows. He has trained >55 postdoctoral fellows and PhD students with many holding faculty positions in different countries (including United States, Australia, Switzerland, Korea, and Japan), as well as mid-level or senior positions in the biotech/ pharmaceutic industry, including one as CEO of a biotechnology company. In 2016, Dr. Ravichandran was awarded an Odysseus I award from the Govt of Flanders in Belgium (FWO) and with the consent of UVA and Ghent University, performs collaborative research at the VIB in Ghent, Belgium. Dr. Ravichandran was recognized as ‘Highly Cited Researcher’ in 2019 with top 1% publications in the past decade.

Dr. Ravichandran's laboratory focuses on how phagocytes have mastered the 'art of eating a good meal'. Specifically, his laboratory focuses on how apoptotic cells are recognized and removed from the body both during homeostasis and disease by the process of 'efferocytosis'. Efferocytic removal of apoptotic cells is usually done by neighboring cells or professional phagocytes such as macrophages. Failure to promptly and efficiently clear apoptotic cells can lead to an aberrant immune response, promoting chronic inflammation and autoimmunity. His laboratory has made key contributions to our current knowledge of the key phagocytes coordinate the many steps in efferocytosis, including: (i) how find-me signals (such as metabolites) released by the dying cells attract phagocytes and communicate messages within the tissue; (ii) how 'eat-me' signals on apoptotic cells are recognized by phagocytes; (iii) how intracellular signaling within phagocytes help change the shape of the phagocyte to take up another cell nearly of the same size as itself; (iv) how the apoptotic cell clearance process is actively anti-inflammatory, in contrast to, for example, bacterial uptake; (v) how a phagocyte manages all of the excess metabolic load acquired from the dying cells. His group uses a combination of cell biological, biochemical, and in vivo analyses using transgenic and knockout mouse models, and models of human inflammatory diseases including arthritis, airway inflammation, colitis, and atherosclerosis. Dr. Ravichandran laboratory has also advanced the concept that the lipid phosphatidylserine (PtdSer), usually associated with apoptotic cell death, is beyond a dead cell marker. PtdSer is transiently exposed on living cells (including live sperm and skeletal muscle) and that PtdSer exposed on living cells is used in diverse processes such as myoblast fusion, sperm:egg fusion, and that PtdSer can function as a key signaling moiety within tissues.

As for November 2020, Dr. Ravichandran's group has published >165 papers in leading journals (including 12 publications in Nature since 2007). The works from his laboratory have been cited >19000 times https://scholar.google.com/citations?user=mliwzYkAAAAJ&hl=en. He has trained >55 postdoctoral fellows and PhD students. Twelve former postdoctoral fellows currently hold faculty positions in different countries, including United States, Australia, Switzerland, Korea, and Japan. Seven of the formal post-docs are currently in mid-level or senior positions in the biotech/ pharmaceutic industry, including one as CEO of a biotechnology company.
