= T-cell vaccination =

Immunization with inactivated T-cells

T-cell vaccination is immunization with inactivated autoreactive T cells. The concept of T-cell vaccination is, at least partially, analogous to classical vaccination against infectious disease. However, the agents to be eliminated or neutralized are not foreign microbial agents but a pathogenic autoreactive T-cell population. Research on T-cell vaccination so far has focused mostly on multiple sclerosis and to a lesser extent on rheumatoid arthritis, Crohn's disease and AIDS.
