= Centre for Gene Regulation and Expression =

UK-based research facility

Coordinates: 56°27′29″N 2°59′09″W

The Centre for Gene Regulation and Expression, located within the School of Life Sciences, University of Dundee, is a research facility working in the field of gene expression and chromosome biology. Previously part of the Dundee Biocentre and receiving significant Wellcome Trust funding from 1995 onwards, it was awarded Wellcome Trust Centre status in 2008. Professor Tom Owen-Hughes is the centre's director.

The centre aims understand how genes are regulated at both the single cell and whole organism level. Researchers use a wide range of techniques, including live cell fluorescent imaging and mass spectrometry-based proteomics, to research the functions of key proteins and molecular mechanisms in cell biology.

== Research and discoveries ==
Live cell imaging and proteomic studies have contributed to researchers' understanding of protein function and cell behaviour.

The centre is studying many aspects of the cell cycle, including the way in which chromosomes replicate and separate during cell division and how DNA damage is detected. Failure of these events can lead to major faults within a genome, potentially leading to the rise of cancerous cells. The centre is also investigating how DNA is tightly wound and compacted so that it can fit into the nuclei of eukaryotic cells, as well as the protein-DNA complexes that are involved in this packaging. The controlled unravelling of DNA is an important step in the regulation of gene function.

== Researchers ==
Angus Lamond, a Wellcome Principal Research Fellow, studies the composition and function of organelles and multiprotein complexes found within the nucleus. This work is helping to explain how a cell's nucleus is organised, an area that has particular importance to human diseases such as inherited genetic conditions which can have modified or disrupted organelles.

Jason Swedlow is a Wellcome Trust Senior Research Fellow and investigates how chromosomes are separated during cell division. The driving force behind this process are strands known as microtubules, which pull the chromosomes apart. His work looks at specialised structures known as kinetochores and the mechanisms which monitor the correct attachment of microtubules to the chromosomes.

Tomo Tanaka studies the processes by which eukaryotic cells maintain their genetic integrity. His group use budding yeast to study chromosome duplication and segregation. By understanding the processes that occur during cell division, it is hoped that a better knowledge will be gained of human diseases such as cancer which are often characterised by chromosome instability.

== See also ==
- Wellcome Trust
- Wellcome Centre for Human Genetics
- Wellcome Trust Centre for Neuroimaging
- Wellcome Trust Centre for Stem Cell Research
- Wellcome Trust Centre for Cell-Matrix Research
