= Glymphatic system =

System for waste clearance in the brain

- Mammalian glymphatic system

Identifiers
- MeSH: D000077502

The glymphatic system, glymphatic clearance pathway, or paravascular system is an organ system for removing metabolic waste from the vertebrate central nervous system (CNS).

In mammals, cerebrospinal fluid flows into the paravascular space around cerebral arteries, where it mixes with interstitial fluid and solutes within the brain parenchyma, and exits via the cerebral venous paravascular spaces into the subarachnoid space.

The pathway consists of a para-arterial influx mechanism for cerebrospinal fluid driven primarily by arterial pulsation. This "massages" the low-pressure cerebrospinal fluid into the denser brain parenchyma. During sleep, flow of cerebrospinal fluid is regulated by changes in parenchyma resistance due to expansion and contraction of the extracellular space.

Clearance of soluble proteins, metabolites, and excess extracellular fluid is accomplished through convective bulk flow, facilitated by astrocytic aquaporin 4 water channels.

The term "glymphatic system" was coined to indicate its dependence upon glial cells and the similarity of its functions to those of the peripheral lymphatic system.

== Structure ==
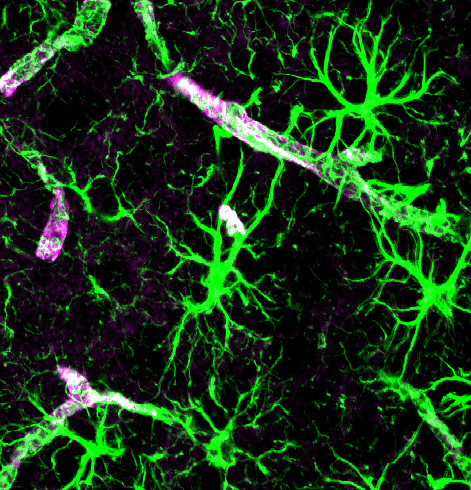
Astrocytes stained for glial fibrillary acidic protein (green) and aquaporin-4 (purple)

A 2012 study indicated that subarachnoid CSF enters the brain rapidly, along the paravascular spaces surrounding the penetrating arteries, then exchanges with surrounding interstitial fluid. Similarly, interstitial fluid is cleared from the brain parenchyma via the paravascular spaces surrounding large veins.

Paravascular spaces are CSF-filled channels formed between brain blood vessels and leptomeningeal sheathes that surround cerebral surface vessels and proximal penetrating vessels. Around these penetrating vessels, paravascular spaces take the form of Virchow-Robin spaces where paravascular CSF can continue traveling along the basement membranes surrounding arterial vascular smooth muscle to reach the basal lamina surrounding brain capillaries.

Astrocytes extend processes that interface with neuronal synapses, as well as projections referred to as 'end-feet' that completely sheathe the brain's vasculature. Astrocytes facilitate changes in blood flow, and possibly influence waste removal from the brain.

Astrocytes express water channels called aquaporins – membrane-bound channels that regulate water flux. The two types of aquaporins expressed in the CNS are aquaporin-1, which is expressed by specialized epithelial cells of the choroid plexus, and aquaporin-4, which is expressed by astrocytes. Up to 50% of the vessel-facing endfoot surface of astrocytes is occupied by aquaporin-4 channels.

Based upon this glial water transport in the process of paravascular interstitial solute clearance, the gliovascular pathway is referred to as the "glymphatic system".

== Function ==
Synchronized oscillations of CSF acting together with norepinephrine affecting cerebral vessels facilitate clearance of metabolic end products from brain activity that accumulated when awake.

=== Solute clearance during sleep ===
During slow-wave sleep, clearance of interstitial solutes increases by expansion and contraction of the extracellular space, indicating that the restorative properties of sleep may be linked to increased glymphatic clearance of metabolic end products produced by neural activity in the awake brain. The flow is elicited by slow variations in the release of norepinephrine by the locus coeruleus. Sleep aids may disrupt the clearance process.

=== Lipid transport ===
Brain paravascular pathways may have a role in transporting small lipophilic molecules affecting astrocyte function.

== History ==
=== Discovery and description of cerebrospinal fluid ===
Although the first known CSF observations date back to Hippocrates (460–375 BCE) and later, to Galen (130–200 CE), its discovery is credited to Emanuel Swedenborg (1688–1772 CE), who, being a devoutly religious man, identified the CSF during his search for the seat of the soul. The sixteen centuries of anatomists who came after Hippocrates and Galen may have missed identifying the CSF due to the prevailing autopsy technique of the times, which included severing the head and draining the blood before dissecting the brain. Although due to his lack of medical credentials Swedenborg's work (in translation) was not published until 1887, he also may have made the first connection between the CSF and the lymphatic system. His description of the CSF was of a "spirituous lymph".

=== CNS lymphatics ===
The meningeal lymphatic system drains fluid from the glymphatic system to the meningeal compartment and deep cervical lymph nodes. The meningeal lymphatics also carry immune cells.

=== Diffusion hypothesis ===
For more than a century the prevailing hypothesis was that the flow of cerebrospinal fluid, which surrounds, but does not come in direct contact with the parenchyma of the CNS, could replace peripheral lymphatic functions and play an important role in the clearance of extracellular solutes.

The majority of the CSF is formed in the choroid plexus and flows through the brain along a distinct pathway: moving through the cerebral ventricular system, into the subarachnoid space surrounding the brain, then draining into the systemic blood column via arachnoid granulations of the dural sinuses or to peripheral lymphatics along cranial nerve sheathes. Mean diffusion times for large molecules, such as albumin, could need up to 100 hours to traverse 1 cm of brain tissue, a rate that is not compatible with the intense metabolic demands of brain tissue. Bulk flow of interstitial fluid from the brain parenchyma to the CSF may be responsible for efficient waste clearance.

Key determinants of diffusion through the brain interstitial spaces are the dimensions and composition of the extracellular compartment. In a series of elegantly designed experiments in the 1980s and 1990s, researchers from New York University explored the microenvironment of the extracellular space using ion-selective micropipettes and ionophoretic point sources. They showed that solute and water movement through the brain parenchyma slows as the extracellular volume fraction decreases and becomes more tortuous.

=== Paravascular channels ===
The continuity between the brain interstitial fluid and CSF was confirmed in 1981 by evidence that interstitial solutes in the brain exchange with CSF via a bulk flow mechanism, rather than by diffusion. Studies in 1985 indicated that cerebrospinal fluid and interstitial fluid may flow along specific anatomical pathways within the brain, with CSF moving into the brain along the outside of blood vessels; it was thought possible that such 'paravascular channels' may be analogous to peripheral lymph vessels, facilitating the clearance of interstitial wastes from the brain. However, other studies did not observe such widespread paravascular CSF–ISF exchange.

=== Dural sinuses and meninges ===
Dural sinuses and meningeal arteries lined by lymphatic vessels may form a connecting pathway to the glymphatic system.

=== Clinical disorders ===
Clinical disorders related to the glymphatic system:

- Traumatic brain injury – is associated with acute and chronic impairment of Glymphatic circulation and, according to human imaging studies, mechanical injury disrupts perivascular pathways, reduces CSF (interstitial fluid exchange) and alters AQP4 polarization.
- Migraine – The impaired perivascular clearance alters CSF flow when sleeping and dysregualted astrocytic signaling may promote some accumulation of inflammatory mediators and metabolic waste products, which sensitize the trigeminvascular pathways. The most common migraine trigger is sleep disruption that can reduce glymphatic function.
- Stroke – causes rapid collapse of glymphatic flow and a loss of arterial pulsatility, cytotoxic edema, and astrocytic swelling which obstructs the perivascular pathways, reduced CSF influx and solute clearance. After strokes, the glymphatic transport experiences peri-infarct inflammation, large infarct volumes, and delayed recovery.
- Normal pressure hydrocephalus (NPH) – described by the ventriculomegaly with normal opening pressure and is associated with measurable abnormalities related to glymphatic function. Diffusion tensor imaging of the perivascular space shows reduced glymphatic activity in the NPH, which supports the hypothesis that impaired CSF contributed to gait disturbances, cognitive decline, and urinary disfunction.
- Sleep disorders – specifically obstructive sleep apnea (OSA), are associated with reduced glymphatic clearance. During slow-wave sleep, the decrease in the expansion of interstitial space and impairment of CSF flow is caused by intermittent hypoxia, sleep fragmentation, and fluctuations in intrathoracic pressure. These factors may contribute to increased risks of cognitive impairment and neurodegenerative disease in individuals with chronic sleep disruption.
