= Fellow of the Royal Society of Biology =

- FRSB

Fellowship of the Royal Society of Biology (FRSB), previously Fellowship of the Society of Biology (FSB), is an award and fellowship granted to individuals that the Royal Society of Biology has adjudged to have made a "prominent contribution to the advancement of the biological sciences, and has gained no less than five years of experience in a position of senior responsibility".

== Fellowship ==
Fellows are entitled to use the post-nominal letters FRSB. As of 2016 examples of fellows include Sir David Attenborough, Martin Hume Johnson, Jasmin Fisher, Sir Tom Blundell and Dame Nancy Rothwell. See the Category: Fellows of the Royal Society of Biology for more examples.
