= Wellcome Trust Centre for Cell-Matrix Research =

English research centre

- Established: 1995
- Affiliations: Wellcome Trust; University of Manchester
- Director: Karl Kadler
- Location: Manchester, United Kingdom
- Website: www.wellcome-matrix.org

The Wellcome Trust Centre for Cell-Matrix Research at the University of Manchester pursues research into extracellular matrix (ECM) biology and its contribution to human diseases. The Centre was established in 1995 by Mike Grant and is funded by the Wellcome Trust.

The Centre set out with the long-term aims of elucidating the structure and function of extracellular matrices and cell-matrix adhesions, defining the contributions of cell-matrix interactions to human diseases, and developing approaches for preventing and treating these diseases.

== Research ==
The Centre focuses on cellular matrix microenvironment, matrix immunobiology, and mechanobiology of the matrix.

As of 2016 principal investigators in the centre include Judi Allen, Clair Baldock, Christoph Ballestrem, Ray Boot-Handford, Pat Caswell, Tony Day, Andrew Gilmore, Richard Grencis, Tim Hardingham, Martin Humphries, Karl Kadler, Rachel Lennon, Qing-Jun Meng, Chris Miller, Martin Schwartz, Charles Streuli, Joe Swift, Dave Thornton, Mark Travis, Sarah Woolner, Ceri Harrop, Thomas Jowitt, David Knight, Toby Starborg and Egor Zindy.
