= List of lymph nodes of the human body =

Regional lymph tissues.

Humans have approximately 500–600 lymph nodes distributed throughout the body, with clusters found in the underarms, groin, neck, chest, and abdomen.

== Lymph nodes of the head ==
- Occipital lymph nodes
- Mastoid lymph nodes
- Parotid lymph nodes

== Lymph nodes of the neck ==
- Cervical lymph nodes
  - Submental lymph nodes
  - Submandibular lymph nodes
- Deep cervical lymph nodes
  - Deep anterior cervical lymph nodes
  - Deep lateral cervical lymph nodes
- Inferior deep cervical lymph nodes
  - Jugulo-omohyoid lymph node
  - Jugulodigastric lymph node
- Supraclavicular lymph nodes
  - Virchow's node

== Lymph nodes of the thorax ==
- Lymph nodes of the lungs: The lymph is drained from the lung tissue through subsegmental, segmental, lobar and interlobar lymph nodes to the hilar lymph nodes, which are located around the hilum (the pedicle, which attaches the lung to the mediastinal structures, containing the pulmonary artery, the pulmonary veins, the main bronchus for each side, some vegetative nerves and the lymphatics) of each lung. The lymph flows subsequently to the mediastinal lymph nodes.
- Mediastinal lymph nodes: They consist of several lymph node groups, especially along the trachea (5 groups), along the esophagus and between the lung and the diaphragm. In the mediastinal lymph nodes arises lymphatic ducts, which drains the lymph to the left subclavian vein (to the venous angle in the confluence of the subclavian and deep jugular veins).

The mediastinal lymph nodes along the esophagus are in tight connection with the abdominal lymph nodes along the esophagus and the stomach. That fact facilitates spreading of tumor cells through these lymphatics in cases of cancers of the stomach and particularly of the esophagus. Through the mediastinum, the main lymphatic drainage from the abdominal organs goes via the thoracic duct (ductus thoracicus), which drains majority of the lymph from the abdomen to the above-mentioned left venous angle.

== Lymph nodes of the abdomen ==
These include:

- Periaortic lymph nodes
  - Preaortic lymph nodes
    - Celiac lymph nodes
      - Hepatic lymph nodes
      - Gastric lymph nodes
      - Splenic lymph nodes
    - Superior mesenteric lymph nodes
    - Inferior mesenteric lymph nodes
  - Retroaortic lymph nodes

Nodes around the iliac vessels are:

- Common iliac lymph nodes
- Internal iliac lymph nodes
- External iliac lymph nodes

Others in the pelvis include:

- Sacral lymph nodes
- Retroperitoneal lymph nodes

== Lymph nodes of the arm ==
These drain the whole of the arm, and are divided into two groups, superficial and deep. The superficial nodes are supplied by lymphatics that are present throughout the arm, but are particularly rich on the palm and flexor aspects of the digits.

- Superficial lymph nodes of the arm:
  - Supratrochlear nodes: Situated above the medial epicondyle of the humerus, medial to the basilic vein, they drain the C7 and C8 dermatomes.
  - Deltoideopectoral nodes: Situated between the pectoralis major and deltoid muscles inferior to the clavicle.
- Deep lymph nodes of the arm: These comprise the axillary nodes, which are 20-30 individual nodes and can be subdivided into:
  - Lateral nodes
  - Anterior or pectoral nodes
  - Posterior or subscapular nodes
  - Central or intermediate nodes
  - Medial or subclavicular nodes

== Lower limbs ==
- Superficial inguinal lymph nodes
- Deep inguinal lymph nodes
- Popliteal lymph nodes

== Distribution ==
The lymphatic vessels that link the lymph nodes are:

- The lymphatics of the head, face, neck, and meningeal lymphatic vessels – drain to the deep cervical lymph nodes
- The jugular trunk
- The subclavian lymph trunk
- The thoracic duct
- The lymphatics of the upper extremity
- The right and left bronchomediastinal lymph trunks
- The lymphatics of the lower extremity
- The lymphatics of the abdomen and pelvis
- The lymphatic vessels of the thorax
