= Esophagus =

Vertebrate organ through which food passes to the stomach

- The digestive tract, with the esophagus marked in red

Details
- Precursor: Foregut
- System: Digestive system
- Artery: Esophageal arteries
- Vein: Esophageal veins
- Nerve: Sympathetic trunk, vagus

Identifiers
- Latin: oesophagus
- Greek: οἰσοφάγος
- MeSH: D004947
- TA98: A05.4.01.001
- TA2: 2887
- FMA: 7131

Upper and lower human gastrointestinal tract

The esophagus (American English) or oesophagus (British English) (/ɪˈsɒfəɡəs, iː-/), also known as the gullet, is an organ in vertebrates through which food passes, aided by peristaltic contractions, from the pharynx to the stomach. The esophagus is a fibromuscular tube, about 25 cm (10 in) long in adult humans, that travels behind the trachea and heart, passes through the diaphragm, and empties into the uppermost region of the stomach. During swallowing, the epiglottis tilts backwards to prevent food from going down the larynx and lungs. The word esophagus is from Ancient Greek οἰσοφάγος (oisophágos), from οἴσω (oísō), future form of φέρω (phérō, "I carry") + ἔφαγον (éphagon, "I ate").

The wall of the esophagus from the lumen outwards consists of mucosa, submucosa (connective tissue), layers of muscle fibers between layers of fibrous tissue, and an outer layer of connective tissue. The mucosa is a stratified squamous epithelium of around three layers of squamous cells, which contrasts to the single layer of columnar cells of the stomach. The transition between these two types of epithelium is visible as a zig-zag line. Most of the muscle is smooth muscle although striated muscle predominates in its upper third. It has two muscular rings or sphincters in its wall, one at the top and one at the bottom. The lower sphincter helps to prevent reflux of acidic stomach content. The esophagus has a rich blood supply and venous drainage. Its smooth muscle is innervated by involuntary nerves (sympathetic nerves via the sympathetic trunk and parasympathetic nerves via the vagus nerve) and in addition voluntary nerves (lower motor neurons) which are carried in the vagus nerve to innervate its striated muscle.

The esophagus may be affected by gastric reflux, cancer, prominent dilated blood vessels called varices that can bleed heavily, tears, constrictions, and disorders of motility. Diseases may cause difficulty swallowing (dysphagia), painful swallowing (odynophagia), chest pain, or cause no symptoms at all. Clinical investigations include X-rays when swallowing barium sulfate, endoscopy, and CT scans. Surgically, the esophagus is difficult to access in part due to its position between critical organs and directly between the sternum and spinal column.

== Structure ==
The esophagus is one of the upper parts of the digestive system. There are taste buds on its upper part. It begins at the back of the mouth, passing downward through the rear part of the mediastinum, through the diaphragm, and into the stomach. In humans, the esophagus generally starts around the level of the sixth cervical vertebra behind the cricoid cartilage of the trachea, enters the diaphragm at about the level of the tenth thoracic vertebra, and ends at the cardia of the stomach, at the level of the eleventh thoracic vertebra. The esophagus is usually about 25 cm (10 in) in length, with only around one centimeter of esophagus lying in the abdominal cavity.

Many blood vessels serve the esophagus, with blood supply varying along its course. The upper parts of the esophagus and the upper esophageal sphincter receive blood from the inferior thyroid artery, the parts of the esophagus in the thorax from the bronchial arteries and branches directly from the thoracic aorta, and the lower parts of the esophagus and the lower esophageal sphincter receive blood from the left gastric artery and the left inferior phrenic artery. The venous drainage also differs along the course of the esophagus. The upper and middle parts of the esophagus drain into the azygos and hemiazygos veins, and blood from the lower part drains into the left gastric vein. All these veins drain into the superior vena cava, with the exception of the left gastric vein, which is a branch of the portal vein. Lymphatically, the upper third of the esophagus drains into the deep cervical lymph nodes, the middle into the superior and posterior mediastinal lymph nodes, and the lower esophagus into the gastric and celiac lymph nodes. This is similar to the lymphatic drainage of the abdominal structures that arise from the foregut, which all drain into the celiac nodes.

Position

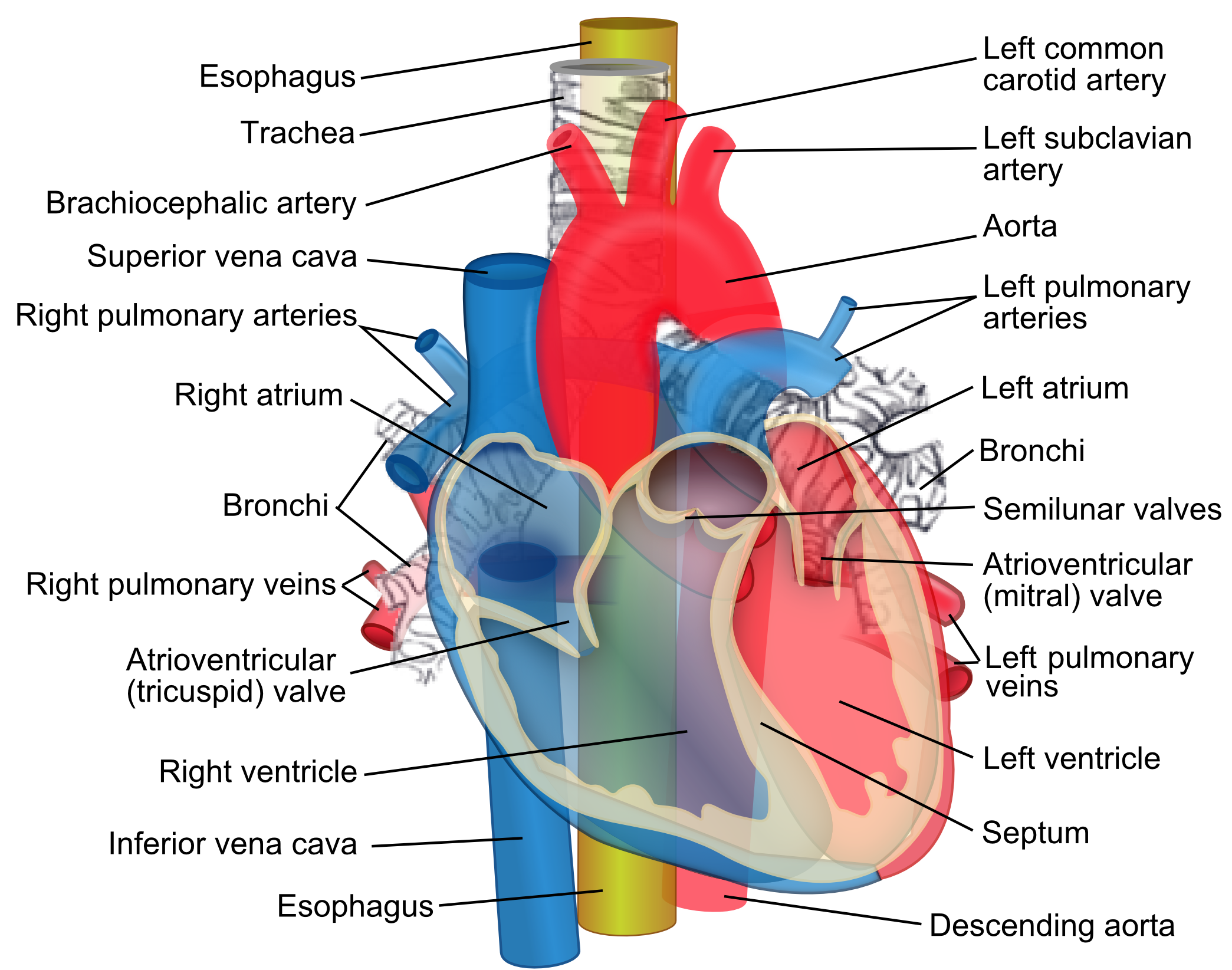
The esophagus (yellow) passes behind the trachea and the heart.

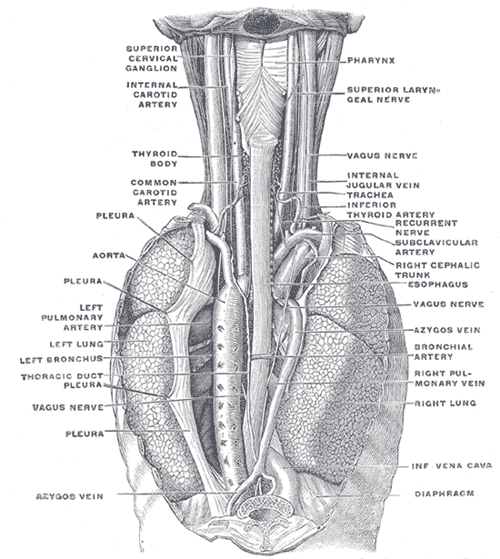
The position and relation of the esophagus in the cervical region and in the posterior mediastinum. Seen from behind.

The upper esophagus lies at the back of the mediastinum behind the trachea, adjoining along the tracheoesophageal stripe, and in front of the erector spinae muscles and the vertebral column. The lower esophagus lies behind the heart and curves in front of the thoracic aorta. From the bifurcation of the trachea downwards, the esophagus passes behind the right pulmonary artery, left main bronchus, and left atrium. At this point, it passes through the diaphragm.

The thoracic duct, which drains the majority of the body's lymph, passes behind the esophagus, curving from lying behind the esophagus on the right in the lower part of the esophagus, to lying behind the esophagus on the left in the upper esophagus. The esophagus also lies in front of parts of the hemiazygos veins and the intercostal veins on the right side. The vagus nerve divides and covers the esophagus in a plexus.

Constrictions

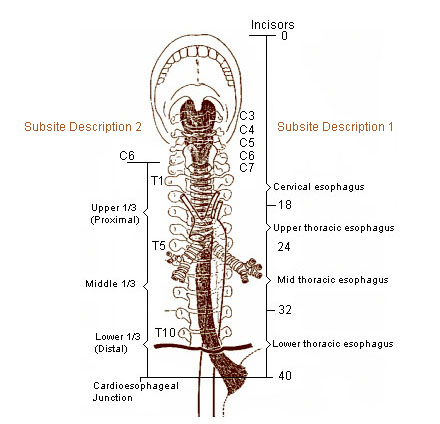
The esophagus is constricted in three places.

The esophagus has four points of constriction. When a corrosive substance, or a solid object is swallowed, it is most likely to lodge and damage one of these four points. These constrictions arise from particular structures that compress the esophagus. These constrictions are:

- At the start of the esophagus, where the laryngopharynx joins the esophagus, behind the cricoid cartilage
- Where it is crossed on the front by the aortic arch in the superior mediastinum
- Where the esophagus is compressed by the left main bronchus in the posterior mediastinum
- The esophageal hiatus, where it passes through the diaphragm in the posterior mediastinum

=== Sphincters ===
The esophagus is surrounded at the top and bottom by two muscular rings, known respectively as the upper esophageal sphincter and the lower esophageal sphincter. These sphincters act to close the esophagus when food is not being swallowed. The upper esophageal sphincter is an anatomical sphincter, which is formed by the lower portion of the inferior pharyngeal constrictor, also known as the cricopharyngeal sphincter due to its relation with cricoid cartilage of the larynx anteriorly. However, the lower esophageal sphincter is not an anatomical but rather a functional sphincter, meaning that it acts as a sphincter but does not have a distinct thickening like other sphincters.

The upper esophageal sphincter surrounds the upper part of the esophagus. It consists of skeletal muscle but is not under voluntary control. Opening of the upper esophageal sphincter is triggered by the swallowing reflex. The primary muscle of the upper esophageal sphincter is the cricopharyngeal part of the inferior pharyngeal constrictor.

The lower esophageal sphincter, or gastroesophageal sphincter, surrounds the lower part of the esophagus at the gastroesophageal junction between the esophagus and the stomach. It is also called the cardiac sphincter or cardioesophageal sphincter, named from the adjacent part of the stomach, the cardia. Dysfunction of the gastroesophageal sphincter causes gastroesophageal reflux, which causes heartburn, and, if it happens often enough, can lead to gastroesophageal reflux disease, with damage of the esophageal mucosa.

=== Nerve supply ===
The esophagus is innervated by the vagus nerve and the cervical and thoracic sympathetic trunk. The vagus nerve has a parasympathetic function, supplying the muscles of the esophagus and stimulating glandular contraction. Two sets of nerve fibers travel in the vagus nerve to supply the muscles. The upper striated muscle, and upper esophageal sphincter, are supplied by neurons with bodies in the nucleus ambiguus, whereas fibers that supply the smooth muscle and lower esophageal sphincter have bodies situated in the dorsal motor nucleus. The vagus nerve plays the primary role in initiating peristalsis. The sympathetic trunk has a sympathetic function. It may enhance the function of the vagus nerve, increasing peristalsis and glandular activity, and causing sphincter contraction. In addition, sympathetic activation may relax the muscle wall and cause blood vessel constriction. Sensation along the esophagus is supplied by both nerves, with gross sensation being passed in the vagus nerve and pain passed up the sympathetic trunk.

=== Gastroesophageal junction ===
The gastroesophageal junction (also known as the esophagogastric junction) is the junction between the esophagus and the stomach, at the lower end of the esophagus. The pink color of the esophageal mucosa contrasts to the deeper red of the gastric mucosa, and the mucosal transition can be seen as an irregular zig-zag line, which is often called the z-line. Histological examination reveals abrupt transition between the stratified squamous epithelium of the esophagus and the simple columnar epithelium of the stomach. Normally, the cardia of the stomach is immediately distal to the z-line and the z-line coincides with the upper limit of the gastric folds of the cardia; however, when the anatomy of the mucosa is distorted in Barrett's esophagus the true gastroesophageal junction can be identified by the upper limit of the gastric folds rather than the mucosal transition. The functional location of the lower oesophageal sphincter is generally situated about 3 cm (1 1/4 in) below the z-line.

=== Microanatomy ===
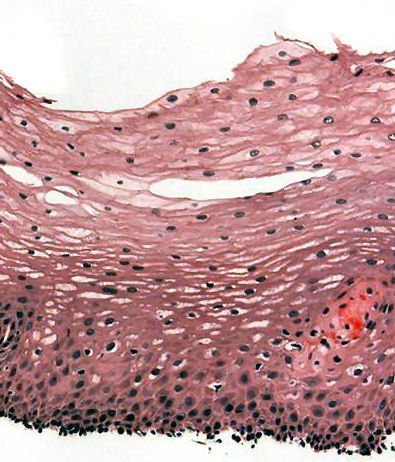
H&E stain of a biopsy of the normal esophageal wall, showing the wall's stratified squamous epithelium

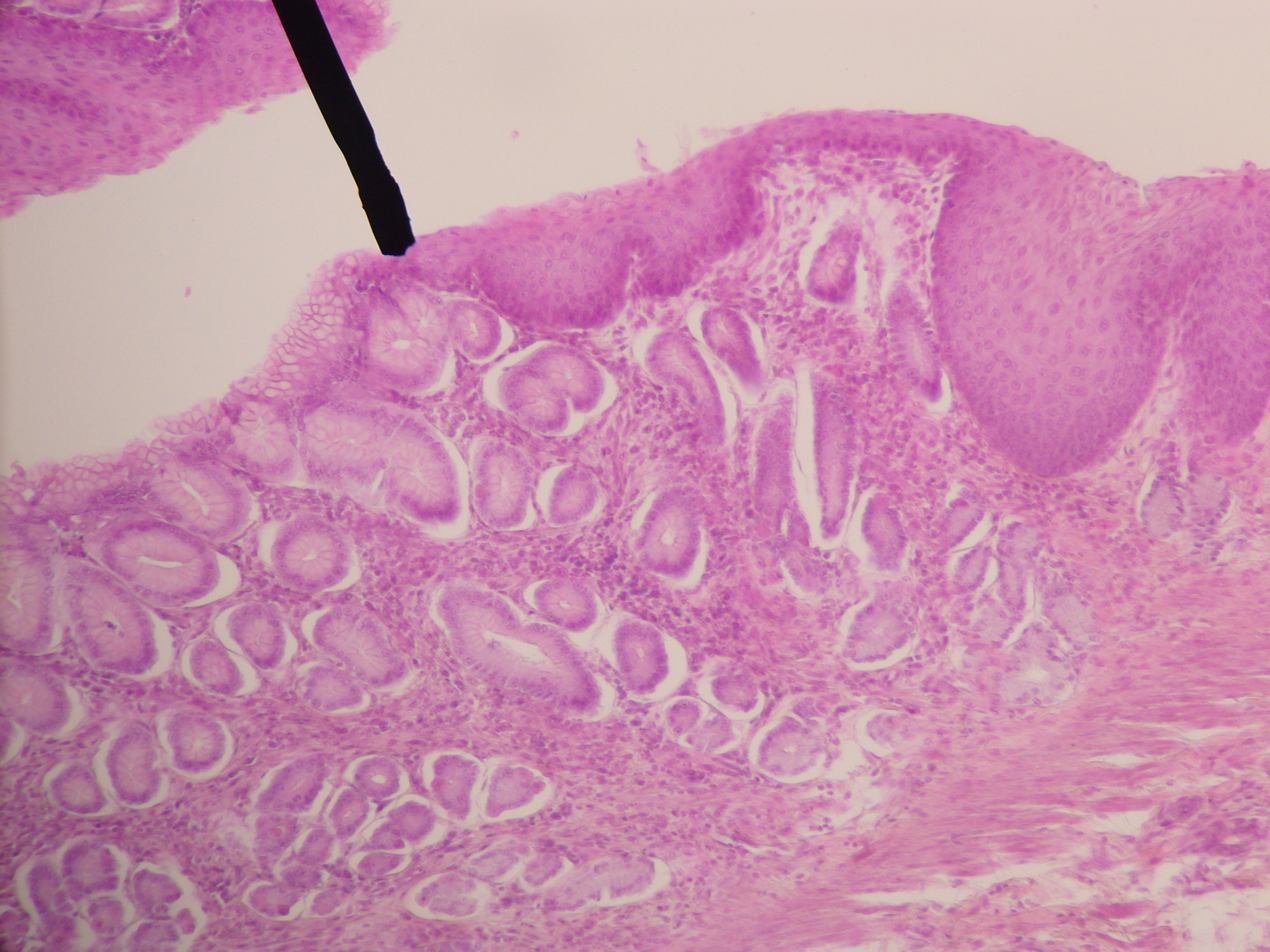
Histological section of the gastroesophageal junction, with a black arrow indicating the junction

Schematic diagram showing all the four layers of the wall of the Esophagus

The human esophagus has a mucous membrane consisting of a tough stratified squamous epithelium without keratin, a smooth lamina propria, and a muscularis mucosae. The epithelium of the esophagus has a relatively rapid turnover and serves a protective function against the abrasive effects of food. In many animals, the epithelium contains a layer of keratin, representing a coarser diet.

The muscular layer of the esophagus has two types of muscle. The upper third of the esophagus contains striated muscle, the lower third contains smooth muscle, and the middle third contains a mixture of both. Muscle is arranged in two layers: one in which the muscle fibers run longitudinal to the esophagus, and the other in which the fibers encircle the esophagus. These are separated by the myenteric plexus, a tangled network of nerve fibers involved in the secretion of mucus and in peristalsis of the smooth muscle of the esophagus. The outermost layer of the esophagus is the adventitia in most of its length, with the abdominal part being covered in serosa. This makes it distinct from many other structures in the gastrointestinal tract that only have a serosa.

==== Glands ====
There are two types of glands, with mucus-secreting esophageal glands being found in the submucosa and esophageal cardiac glands, similar to cardiac glands of the stomach, located in the lamina propria and most frequent in the terminal part of the organ. The mucus from the glands gives a good protection to the lining. The submucosa also contains the submucosal plexus, a network of nerve cells that is part of the enteric nervous system.

== Development ==
In early embryogenesis, the esophagus develops from the endodermal primitive gut tube. The ventral part of the embryo abuts the yolk sac. It is very small in the beginning, but it lengthens due to descent of lungs and heart. During the second week of embryological development, as the embryo grows, it begins to surround parts of the sac. The enveloped portions form the basis for the adult gastrointestinal tract. The sac is surrounded by a network of vitelline arteries. Over time, these arteries consolidate into the three main arteries that supply the developing gastrointestinal tract: the celiac artery, superior mesenteric artery, and inferior mesenteric artery. The areas supplied by these arteries are used to define the midgut, hindgut and foregut.

The surrounded sac becomes the primitive gut. Sections of this gut begin to differentiate into the organs of the gastrointestinal tract, such as the esophagus, stomach, and intestines. The esophagus develops as part of the foregut tube. The esophagus develops as a tube, lined with smooth muscle but continues development craniocaudally into different proportions of striated muscle. Both types of muscle have been demonstrated to be of different precursor cells. The innervation of the esophagus develops from the pharyngeal arches.

== Function ==
=== Swallowing ===
Food is ingested through the mouth and when swallowed passes first into the pharynx and then into the esophagus. The esophagus is thus one of the first components of the digestive system and the gastrointestinal tract. After food passes through the esophagus, it enters the stomach. When food is being swallowed, the epiglottis moves backward to cover the larynx, preventing food from entering the trachea. At the same time, the upper esophageal sphincter relaxes, allowing a food bolus to enter. Peristaltic contractions of the esophageal muscle push the food down the esophagus. These rhythmic contractions occur both as a reflex response to food that is in the mouth, and also as a response to the sensation of food within the esophagus itself. Along with peristalsis, the lower esophageal sphincter relaxes.

=== Reducing gastric reflux ===
The stomach produces gastric juice, a mixture consisting of gastric acid (mainly hydrochloric acid), lipase, and pepsin to enable food digestion. Constriction of the lower esophageal sphincter protects the esophageal mucosa by preventing reflux, the backflow of acid and gastric contents into the esophagus. The acute angle of His and the lower crura of the diaphragm also help this sphincteric action.

== Gene and protein expression ==
About 20,000 protein-coding genes are expressed in human cells and nearly 70% of these genes are expressed in the normal esophagus. Some 250 of these genes are more specifically expressed in the esophagus with less than 50 genes being highly specific. The corresponding esophagus-specific proteins are mainly involved in squamous differentiation such as keratins KRT13, KRT4 and KRT6C. Other specific proteins that help lubricate the inner surface of esophagus are mucins such as MUC21 and MUC22. Many genes with elevated expression are also shared with skin and other organs that are composed of squamous epithelia.

== Clinical significance ==
The main conditions affecting the esophagus are described here. For a more complete list, see esophageal disease.

=== Inflammation ===
Inflammation of the esophagus is known as esophagitis. Reflux of gastric acids from the stomach, infection, substances ingested (for example, corrosives), some medications (such as bisphosphonates), and food allergies can all lead to esophagitis. Esophageal candidiasis is an infection of the yeast Candida albicans that may occur when a person is immunocompromised. As of 2021 the causes of some forms of esophagitis, such as eosinophilic esophagitis, are not well-characterized, but may include Th2-mediated atopies or genetic factors. There appear to be correlations between eosinophilic esophagitis, asthma (itself with an eosinophilic component), eczema, and allergic rhinitis, though it is not clear whether these conditions contribute to eosinophilic esophagitis or vice versa, or if they are symptoms of mutual underlying factors. Esophagitis can cause painful swallowing and is usually treated by managing the cause of the esophagitis - such as managing reflux or treating infection.

=== Barrett's esophagus ===
Prolonged esophagitis, particularly from gastric reflux, is one factor thought to play a role in the development of Barrett's esophagus. In this condition, there is metaplasia of the lining of the lower esophagus, which changes from stratified squamous epithelia to simple columnar epithelia. Barrett's esophagus is thought to be one of the main contributors to the development of esophageal cancer.

=== Cancer ===
There are two main types of cancer of the esophagus. Squamous cell carcinoma is a carcinoma that can occur in the squamous cells lining the esophagus. This type is much more common in China and Iran. The other main type is an adenocarcinoma that occurs in the glands or columnar tissue of the esophagus. This is most common in developed countries in those with Barrett's esophagus, and occurs in the cuboidal cells.

In its early stages, esophageal cancer may not have any symptoms at all. When severe, esophageal cancer may eventually cause obstruction of the esophagus, making swallowing of any solid foods very difficult and causing weight loss. The progress of the cancer is staged using a system that measures how far into the esophageal wall the cancer has invaded, how many lymph nodes are affected, and whether there are any metastases in different parts of the body. Esophageal cancer is often managed with radiotherapy, chemotherapy, and may also be managed by partial surgical removal of the esophagus. Inserting a stent into the esophagus, or inserting a nasogastric tube, may also be used to ensure that a person is able to digest enough food and water. As of 2014, the prognosis for esophageal cancer is still poor, so palliative therapy may also be a focus of treatment.

=== Varices ===
Esophageal varices are swollen twisted branches of the azygous vein in the lower third of the esophagus. These blood vessels anastomose (join up) with those of the portal vein when portal hypertension develops. These blood vessels are engorged more than normal, and in the worst cases may partially obstruct the esophagus. These blood vessels develop as part of a collateral circulation that occurs to drain blood from the abdomen as a result of portal hypertension, usually as a result of liver diseases such as cirrhosis. This collateral circulation occurs because the lower part of the esophagus drains into the left gastric vein, which is a branch of the portal vein. Because of the extensive venous plexus that exists between this vein and other veins, if portal hypertension occurs, the direction of blood drainage in this vein may reverse, with blood draining from the portal venous system, through the plexus. Veins in the plexus may engorge and lead to varices.

Esophageal varices often do not have symptoms until they rupture. A ruptured varix is considered a medical emergency because varices can bleed a lot. A bleeding varix may cause a person to vomit blood, or suffer shock. To deal with a ruptured varix, a band may be placed around the bleeding blood vessel, or a small amount of a clotting agent may be injected near the bleed. A surgeon may also try to use a small inflatable balloon to apply pressure to stop the wound. IV fluids and blood products may be given in order to prevent hypovolemia from excess blood loss.

=== Motility disorders ===
Several disorders affect the motility of food as it travels down the esophagus. This can cause difficult swallowing, called dysphagia, or painful swallowing, called odynophagia. Achalasia refers to a failure of the lower esophageal sphincter to relax properly, and generally develops later in life. This leads to progressive enlargement of the esophagus, and possibly eventual megaesophagus. A nutcracker esophagus refers to swallowing that can be extremely painful. Diffuse esophageal spasm is a spasm of the esophagus that can be one cause of chest pain. Such referred pain to the wall of the upper chest is quite common in esophageal conditions. Sclerosis of the esophagus, such as with systemic sclerosis or in CREST syndrome may cause hardening of the walls of the esophagus and interfere with peristalsis.

=== Malformations ===
Esophageal strictures are usually benign and typically develop after a person has had reflux for many years. Other strictures may include esophageal webs (which can also be congenital) and damage to the esophagus by radiotherapy, corrosive ingestion, or eosinophilic esophagitis. A Schatzki ring is fibrosis at the gastroesophageal junction. Strictures may also develop in chronic anemia, and Plummer-Vinson syndrome.

Two of the most common congenital malformations affecting the esophagus are an esophageal atresia where the esophagus ends in a blind sac instead of connecting to the stomach; and an esophageal fistula – an abnormal connection between the esophagus and the trachea. Both of these conditions usually occur together. These are found in about 1 in 3500 births. Half of these cases may be part of a syndrome where other abnormalities are also present, particularly of the heart or limbs. The other cases occur singly.

=== Imaging ===
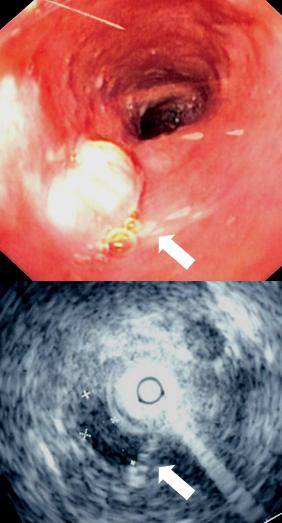
A mass seen during an endoscopy and an ultrasound of the mass conducted during the endoscopy session

An X-ray of swallowed barium may be used to reveal the size and shape of the esophagus, and the presence of any masses. The esophagus may also be imaged using a flexible camera inserted into the esophagus, in a procedure called an endoscopy. If an endoscopy is used on the stomach, the camera will also have to pass through the esophagus. During an endoscopy, a biopsy may be taken. If cancer of the esophagus is being investigated, other methods, including a CT scan, may also be used.

== History ==
The word esophagus (British English: oesophagus), comes from the Greek: οἰσοφάγος (oisophagos) meaning gullet. It derives from two roots (eosin) to carry and (phagos) to eat. The use of the word esophagus, has been documented in anatomical literature since at least the time of Hippocrates, who noted that "the oesophagus ... receives the greatest amount of what we consume." Its existence in other animals and its relationship with the stomach was documented by the Roman naturalist Pliny the Elder (AD23–AD79), and the peristaltic contractions of the esophagus have been documented since at least the time of Galen.

The first attempt at surgery on the esophagus focused in the neck, and was conducted in dogs by Theodore Billroth in 1871. In 1877 Czerny carried out surgery in people. By 1908, an operation had been performed by Voeckler to remove the esophagus, and in 1933 the first surgical removal of parts of the lower esophagus, (to control esophageal cancer), had been conducted.

The Nissen fundoplication, in which the stomach is wrapped around the lower esophageal sphincter to stimulate its function and control reflux, was first conducted by Rudolph Nissen in 1955.

== Other animals ==
=== Vertebrates ===
Anatomy of a snake:^{file info}: 1. esophagus; 2. trachea; 3. tracheal lungs; 4. rudimentary left lung; 5. right lung; 6. heart; 7. liver; 8. stomach; 9. air sac; 10. gallbladder; 11. pancreas; 12. spleen; 13. intestine; 14. testicles; 15. kidneys

1. Bile ducts: 2. Intrahepatic bile ducts; 3. Left and right hepatic ducts; 4. Common hepatic duct; 5. Cystic duct; 6. Common bile duct; 7. Ampulla of Vater; 8. Major duodenal papilla; 9. Gallbladder; 10–11. Right and left lobes of liver: 12. Spleen; 13. Esophagus; 14. Stomach; 15. Pancreas: 16. Accessory pancreatic duct; 17. Pancreatic duct; 18. Small intestine: 19. Duodenum; 20. Jejunum; 21–22. Right and left kidneys The front border of the liver has been lifted up (brown arrow).

In tetrapods, the pharynx is much shorter, and the esophagus correspondingly longer, than in fish. In the majority of vertebrates, the esophagus is simply a connecting tube, but in some birds, which regurgitate components to feed their young, it is extended towards the lower end to form a crop for storing food before it enters the true stomach. In ruminants, animals with four chambered stomachs, a groove called the sulcus reticuli is often found in the esophagus, allowing milk to drain directly into the hind stomach, the abomasum. In the horse the esophagus is about 1.2 to 1.5 m (4 to 5 ft) in length, and carries food to the stomach. A muscular ring, called the cardiac sphincter, connects the stomach to the esophagus. This sphincter is very well developed in horses. This and the oblique angle at which the esophagus connects to the stomach explains why horses cannot vomit. The esophagus is also the area of the digestive tract where horses may have the condition known as choke.

The esophagus of snakes is remarkable for the distension it undergoes when swallowing prey.

In most fish, the esophagus is extremely short, primarily due to the length of the pharynx (which is associated with the gills). However, some fish, including lampreys, chimaeras, and lungfish, have no true stomach, so that the esophagus effectively runs from the pharynx directly to the intestine, and is therefore somewhat longer.

In many vertebrates, the esophagus is lined by stratified squamous epithelium without glands. In fish, the esophagus is often lined with columnar epithelium, and in amphibians, sharks and rays, the esophageal epithelium is ciliated, helping to wash food along, in addition to the action of muscular peristalsis. In addition, in the bat Plecotus auritus, fish and some amphibians, glands secreting pepsinogen or hydrochloric acid have been found.

The muscle of the esophagus in many mammals is initially striated but then becomes smooth muscle in the caudal third or so. In canines and ruminants, however, it is entirely striated to allow regurgitation to feed young (canines) or regurgitation to chew cud (ruminants). It is entirely smooth muscle in amphibians, reptiles and birds.

Contrary to popular belief, an adult human body would not be able to pass through the esophagus of a whale, which generally measures less than 10 cm (4 in) in diameter, although in larger baleen whales it may be up to 25 cm (10 in) when fully distended.

=== Invertebrates ===
A structure with the same name is often found in invertebrates, including molluscs and arthropods, connecting the oral cavity with the stomach. In terms of the digestive system of snails and slugs, the mouth opens into an esophagus, which connects to the stomach. Because of torsion, which is the rotation of the main body of the animal during larval development, the esophagus usually passes around the stomach, and opens into its back, furthest from the mouth. In species that have undergone de-torsion, however, the esophagus may open into the anterior of the stomach, which is the reverse of the usual gastropod arrangement. There is an extensive rostrum at the front of the esophagus in all carnivorous snails and slugs. In the freshwater snail species Tarebia granifera, the brood pouch is above the esophagus.

In the cephalopods, the brain often surrounds the esophagus.
