= Periaortic lymph nodes =

Human lymph nodes

- Lymph nodes. (Paraaortic labeled in center in blue.)

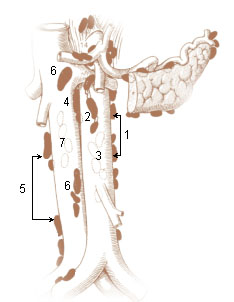
Left lumbar lymph nodes (paraaortic lymph nodes)
- 1. Lateral aortic
- 2. Preaortic
- 3. Postaortic
- 4. Intermediate lumbar
Right lumbar lymph nodes (paracaval lymph nodes)
- 5. Lateral caval
- 6. Precaval
- 7. Postcaval

Details
- System: Lymphatic system

The periaortic lymph nodes (also known as lumbar) are a group of lymph nodes that lie in front of the lumbar vertebrae near the aorta. These lymph nodes receive drainage from the gastrointestinal tract and the abdominal organs.

The periaortic lymph nodes are different from the paraaortic lymph nodes. The periaortic group is the general group, that is subdivided into: preaortic, paraaortic, and retroaortic groups. The paraaortic group is synonymous with the lateral aortic group.

== Divisions ==
The periaortic lymph node group is divided into three subgroups: preaortic, paraaortic, and retroaortic:

- The preaortic group drains the gastrointestinal viscera. They can be subdivided into three groups: the celiac nodes, the superior mesenteric nodes, and the inferior mesenteric nodes.
- The paraaortic group (also known as lateral aortic group) drains the iliac nodes, the ovaries, the testes and other pelvic organs. The lateral group nodes are located adjacent to the aorta, anterior to the spine, extending laterally to the edge of the psoas major muscles, and superiorly to the crura of the diaphragm.
- The retroaortic group are sometimes included in the paraaortic group due to their position (which is also lateral) and the same pattern of lymphatic drainage.

The right paraaortic nodes, are situated partly in front of the inferior vena cava near the termination of the renal vein, and partly behind it on the origin of the psoas major, and on the right crus of diaphragm.

The left paraaortic nodes form a chain on the left side of the abdominal aorta in front of the origin of the psoas major and on the left crus of the diaphragm.

The paraaortic and retroaortic nodes receive:

- (a) the efferents of the common iliac lymph nodes
- (b) the lymphatics from the testis in the male, and from the ovary, uterine tube, and uterus in the female
- (c) the lymphatics from the kidney and suprarenal gland
- (d) the lymphatics draining the lateral abdominal muscles and accompanying the lumbar veins

Most of the efferent vessels from the paraaortic nodes converge to form the right and left lumbar trunks which join the cisterna chyli, but some enter the preaortic and retroaortic lymph nodes, and others pierce the crura of the diaphragm to join the lower end of the thoracic duct.

== Dissection ==
The lateral aortic lymph nodes, typically 15 to 20 on each side, are the ones usually chosen for dissection or biopsy in the treatment or diagnosis of cancer.

A dissection usually includes the region from the bifurcation of the aorta to the superior mesenteric artery or the renal veins.

== Additional images ==
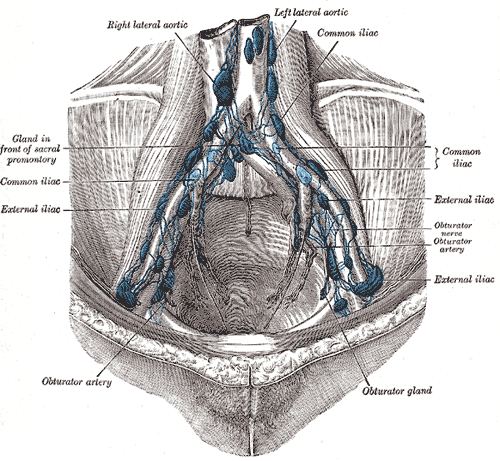
The parietal lymph glands of the pelvis.

== Bibliography ==
- Standring et al. - Gray's Anatomy, The Anatomical Basis of Clinical Practice [41st edition, 2016]

== See also ==
- Retroperitoneal lymph node dissection
