= Aortic lymph nodes =

Aortic lymph nodes may refer to:

- Lateral aortic lymph nodes
- Paraaortic lymph node
- Retroaortic lymph nodes
