= Seminal vesicles =

Pair of simple tubular glands

Seminal vesicle
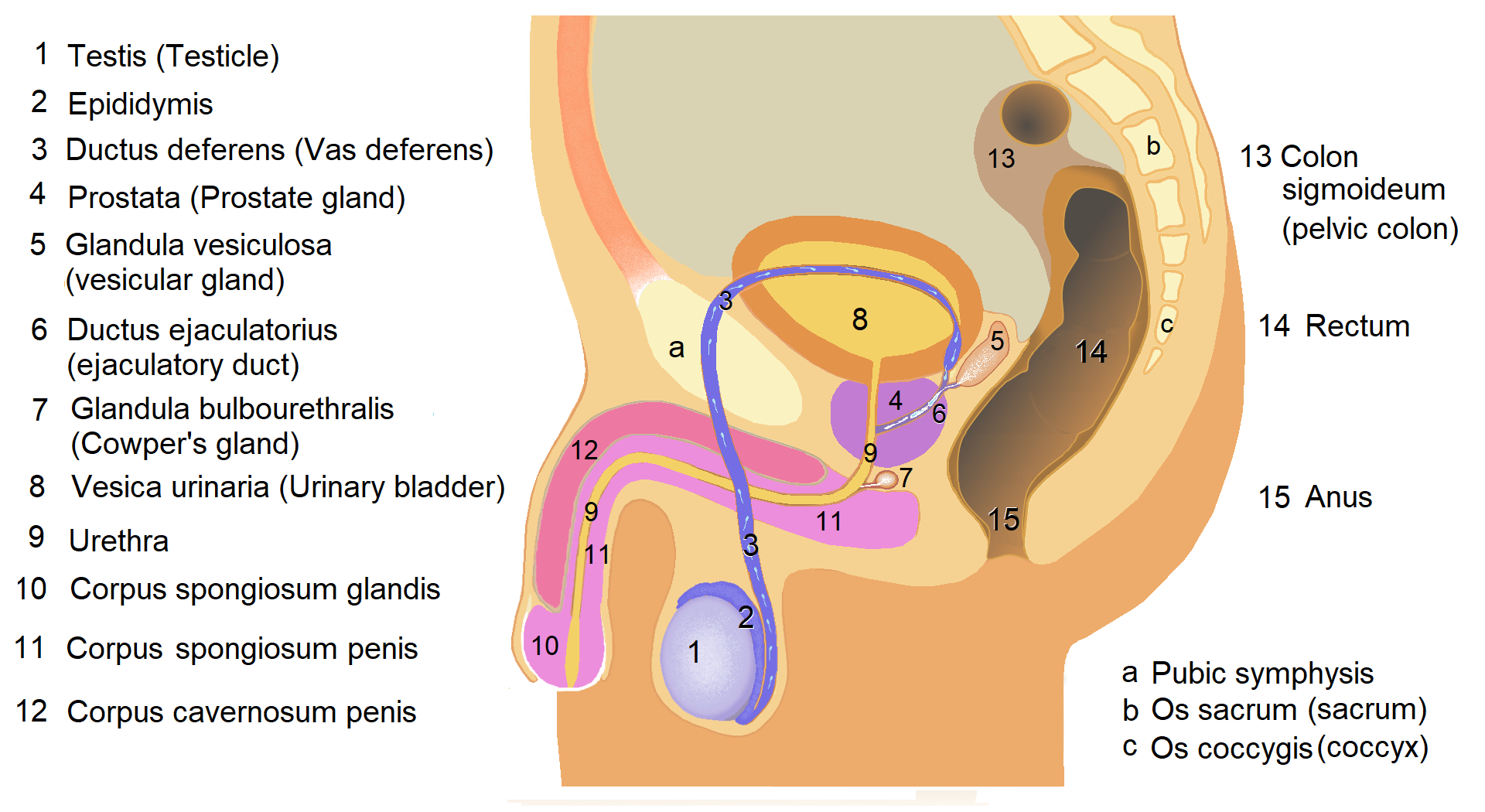
- Cross-section of the lower abdomen in a male, showing parts of the urinary tract and male reproductive system, with the seminal vesicles seen top right

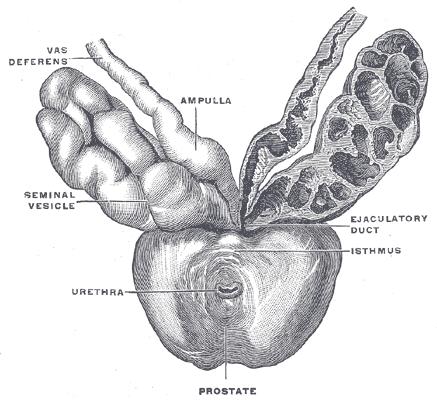
- The seminal vesicles seen near the prostate, viewed from in front and above.

Details
- Precursor: Mesonephric ducts
- System: Male reproductive system
- Artery: Inferior vesical artery, middle rectal artery
- Lymph: External iliac lymph nodes, internal iliac lymph nodes

Identifiers
- Latin: vesiculae seminales, glandulae vesiculosae
- MeSH: D012669
- TA98: A09.3.06.001
- TA2: 3631
- FMA: 19386

The seminal vesicles (also called vesicular glands or seminal glands) are a pair of convoluted tubular accessory glands that lie behind the urinary bladder of male mammals. They secrete fluid that largely composes the semen.

The vesicles are 5–10 cm (2.0–3.9 in) in size, 3–5 cm (1.2–2.0 in) in diameter, and are located between the bladder and the rectum. They have multiple outpouchings, which contain secretory glands, which join together with the vasa deferentia at the ejaculatory ducts. They receive blood from the vesiculodeferential artery, and drain into the vesiculodeferential veins. The glands are lined with column-shaped and cuboidal cells. The vesicles are present in many groups of mammals, but not marsupials, monotremes or carnivores..

Inflammation of the seminal vesicles is called seminal vesiculitis and most often is due to bacterial infection as a result of a sexually transmitted infection or following a surgical procedure. Seminal vesiculitis can cause pain in the lower abdomen, scrotum, penis or peritoneum, painful ejaculation, and blood in the semen. It is usually treated with antibiotics, although may require surgical drainage in complicated cases. Other conditions may affect the vesicles, including congenital abnormalities such as failure or incomplete formation, and, uncommonly, tumours.

The seminal vesicles have been described as early as the second century AD by Galen, although the vesicles only received their name much later, as they were initially described using the term from which the word prostate is derived.

== Structure ==
The human seminal vesicles are a pair of glands in males that are positioned below the urinary bladder and at the end of the vasa deferentia, where they enter the prostate. Each vesicle is a coiled and folded tube, with occasional outpouchings termed diverticula in its wall. The lower part of the tube ends as a straight tube called the excretory duct, which joins with the ipsilateral vas deferens to form an ejaculatory duct. The ejaculatory ducts pass through the prostate gland before opening separately into the verumontanum of the prostatic urethra. The vesicles are between 5–10 cm (2.0–3.9 in) in size, 3–5 cm (1.2–2.0 in) in diameter, and have a volume of around 13 mL.

The vesicles receive blood supply from the vesiculodeferential artery, and also from the inferior vesical artery. The vesiculodeferential artery arises from the umbilical arteries, which branch directly from the internal iliac arteries. Blood is drained into the vesiculodeferential veins and the inferior vesical plexus, which drain into the internal iliac veins. Lymphatic drainage occurs along the venous routes, draining into the internal iliac nodes.

The vesicles lie behind the bladder at the end of the vasa deferentia. They lie in the space between the bladder and the rectum; the bladder and prostate lie in front, the tip of the ureter as it enters the bladder above, and Denonvilliers' fascia and the rectum behind.

=== Development ===
In the developing embryo, at the hind end lies a cloaca. This, over the fourth to the seventh week, divides into a urogenital sinus and the beginnings of the anal canal, with a wall forming between these two inpouchings called the urorectal septum. Two ducts form next to each other that connect to the urogenital sinus; the mesonephric duct and the paramesonephric duct, which go on to form the reproductive tracts of the male and female respectively.

In the male, under the influence of testosterone, the mesonephric ducts proliferate, forming the epididymis, ductus deferens and, via a small outpouching near the developing prostate, the seminal vesicles. Sertoli cells secrete anti-Müllerian hormone, which causes the paramesonephric ducts to regress.

The development and maintenance of the seminal vesicles, as well as their secretion and size/weight, are highly dependent on androgens. The seminal vesicles contain 5α-reductase, which metabolizes testosterone into its much more potent metabolite, dihydrotestosterone (DHT). The seminal vesicles have also been found to contain luteinizing hormone receptors, and hence may also be regulated by the ligand of this receptor, luteinizing hormone.

=== Microanatomy ===
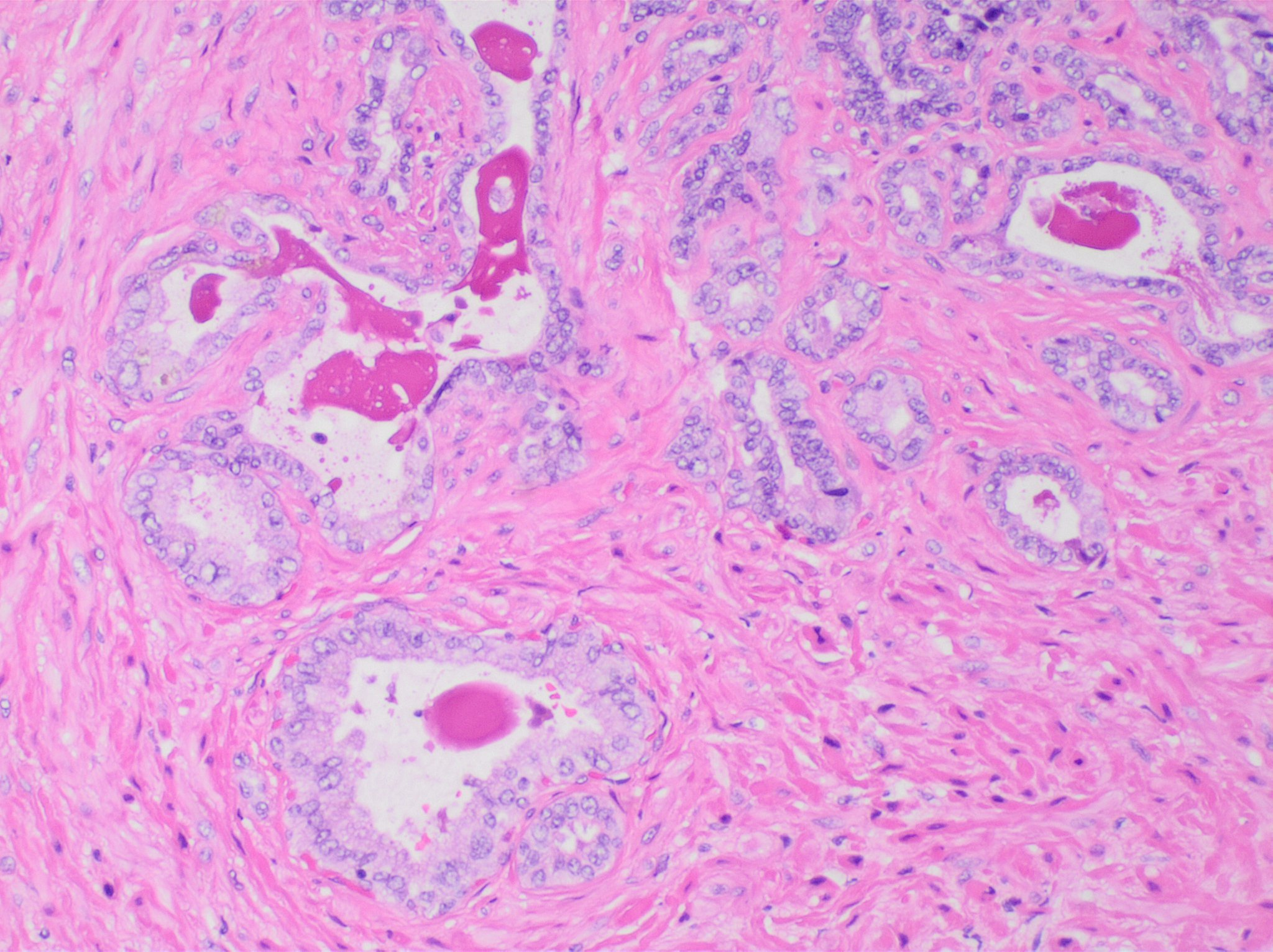
Histology of seminal vesicle glands on H&E stain. They may mimic prostatic adenocarcinoma by crowded glands with enlarged hyperchromatic and irregular nuclei, but will have inconspicuous nucleoli and coarse refractile golden brown lipofuscin granules.

The inner lining of the seminal vesicles (the epithelium) is made of a lining of interspersed column-shaped and cube-shaped cells. There are varying descriptions of the lining as being pseudostratified and consisting of column-shaped cells only. When viewed under a microscope, the cells are seen to have large bubbles in their interior. This is because their interior, called cytoplasm, contains lipid droplets involved in secretion during ejaculation. The tissue of the seminal vesicles is full of glands, spaced irregularly. As well as glands, the seminal vesicles contain smooth muscle and connective tissue. This fibrous and muscular tissue surrounds the glands, helping to expel their contents. The outer surface of the glands is covered in peritoneum.

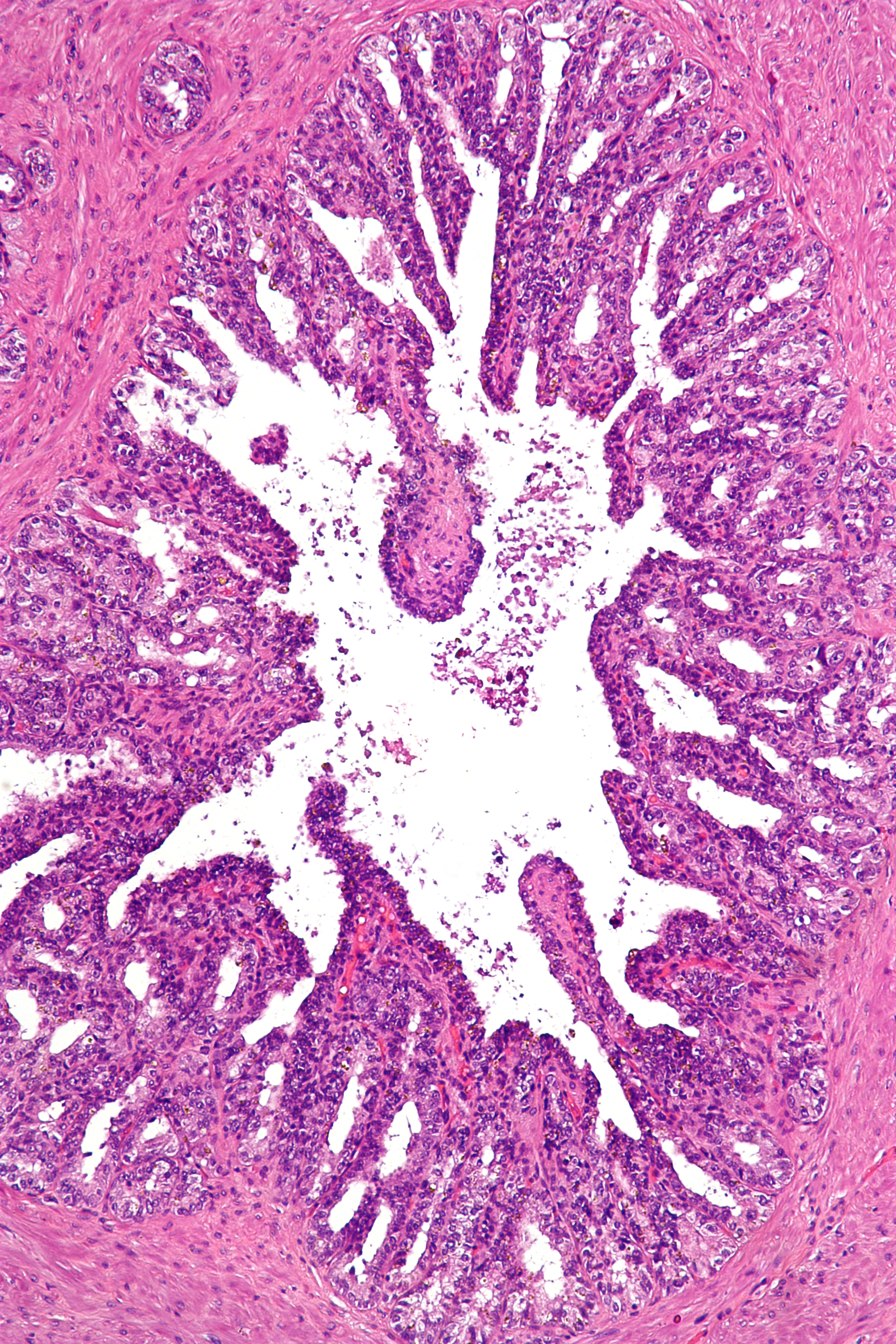
Low magnification micrograph of seminal vesicle. H&E stain.

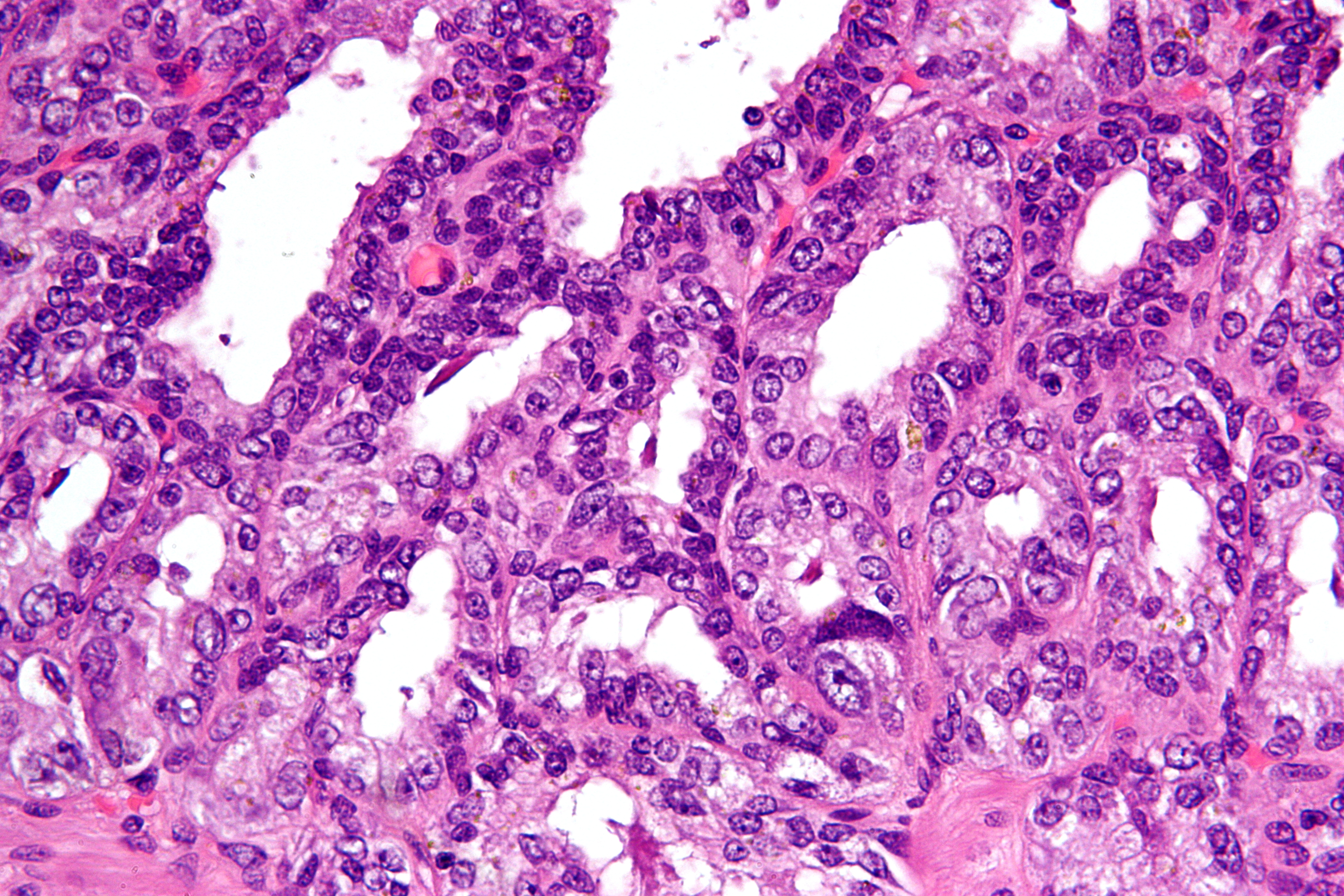
High magnification micrograph of seminal vesicle. H&E stain.

== Function ==
The seminal vesicles secrete a significant proportion of the fluid that ultimately becomes semen. Fluid is secreted from the ejaculatory ducts of the vesicles into the vas deferens and ejaculated through the urethra during the male sexual response.

About 70-85% of the seminal fluid in humans originates from the seminal vesicles. The fluid consists of nutrients including fructose and citric acid, prostaglandins, and fibrinogen.

Nutrients help support sperm until fertilisation occurs; prostaglandins may also assist by softening mucus of the cervix, and by causing reverse contractions of parts of the female reproductive tract such as the fallopian tubes, to ensure that sperm are less likely to be expelled.

== Clinical significance ==
=== Disease ===
Diseases of the seminal vesicles, in contrast to diseases of the prostate gland, are extremely rare and are infrequently reported in the medical literature.

Congenital anomalies associated with the seminal vesicles include failure to develop, either completely (agenesis) or partially (hypoplasia), and cysts. Failure of the vesicles to form is often associated with absent vas deferens, or an abnormal connection between the vas deferens and the ureter. The seminal vesicles may also be affected by cysts, amyloidosis, and stones. Stones or cysts that become infected, or obstruct the vas deferens or seminal vesicles, may require surgical intervention.

Seminal vesiculitis (also known as spermatocystitis) is an inflammation of the seminal vesicles, most often caused by bacterial infection. Symptoms can include vague back or lower abdominal pain; pain of the penis, scrotum or peritoneum; painful ejaculation; blood in the semen on ejaculation; irritative and obstructive voiding symptoms; and impotence. Infection may be due to sexually transmitted infections, as a complication of a procedure such as prostate biopsy. It is usually treated with antibiotics. If a person experiences ongoing discomfort, transurethral seminal vesiculoscopy may be considered. Intervention in the form of drainage through the skin or surgery may also be required if the infection becomes an abscess. The seminal vesicles may also be affected by tuberculosis, schistosomiasis and hydatid disease. These diseases are investigated, diagnosed and treated according to the underlying disease.

Benign tumours of the seminal vesicles are rare. When they do occur, they are usually papillary adenomata and cystadenomata. They do not cause elevation of tumour markers and are usually diagnosed based on examination of tissue that has been removed after surgery. Primary adenocarcinoma, although rare, constitutes the most common malignant tumour of the seminal vesicles; that said, malignant involvement of the vesicles is typically the result of local invasion from an extra-vesicular lesion. When adenocarcinoma occurs, it can cause blood in the urine, blood in the semen, painful urination, urinary retention, or even urinary obstruction. Adenocarcinomata are usually diagnosed after they are excised, based on tissue diagnosis. Some produce the tumour marker Ca-125, which can be used to monitor for reoccurrence afterwards. Even rarer neoplasms include sarcoma, squamous cell carcinoma, yolk sac tumour, neuroendocrine carcinoma, paraganglioma, epithelial stromal tumours and lymphoma.

=== Investigations ===
Symptoms due to diseases of the seminal vesicles may be vague and not able to be specifically attributable to the vesicles themselves; additionally, some conditions such as tumours or cysts may not cause any symptoms at all. When diseases is suspected, such as due to pain on ejaculation, blood in the urine, infertility, due to urinary tract obstruction, further investigations may be conducted.

A digital rectal examination, which involves a finger inserted by a medical practitioner through the anus, may cause greater than usual tenderness of the prostate gland, or may reveal a large seminal vesicle. Palpation is dependent on the length of index finger as seminal vesicles are located above the prostate gland and retrovesical (behind the bladder).

A urine specimen may be collected, and is likely to demonstrate blood within the urine. Laboratory examination of seminal vesicle fluid requires a semen sample, e.g. for semen culture or semen analysis. Fructose levels provide a measure of seminal vesicle function and, if absent, bilateral agenesis or obstruction is suspected.

Imaging of the vesicles is provided by medical imaging; either by transrectal ultrasound, CT or MRI scans. An examination using cystoscopy, where a flexible tube is inserted in the urethra, may show disease of the vesicles because of changes in the normal appearance of the nearby bladder trigone, or prostatic urethra.

== Other animals ==
The evolution of seminal vesicles may have been influenced by sexual selection. They occur in birds and reptiles and many groups of mammals, but are absent in marsupials, monotremes, and carnivorans. The function is similar in all mammals they are present in, which is to secrete a fluid as part of semen that is ejaculated during the sexual response.

== History ==
The action of the seminal vesicles has been described as early the second century AD by Galen, as "glandular bodies" that secrete substances alongside semen during reproduction. By the time of Herophilus the presence of the glands and associated ducts had been described. Around the time of the early 17th century the word used to describe the vesicles, parastatai, eventually and unambiguously was used to refer to the prostate gland, rather than the vesicles. The first time the prostate was portrayed in an individual drawing was by Regnier De Graaf in 1678.

The first described use of laparoscopic surgery on the vesicles was described in 1993; this is now the preferred approach because of decreased pain, complications, and a shorter hospital stay.

== Additional images ==
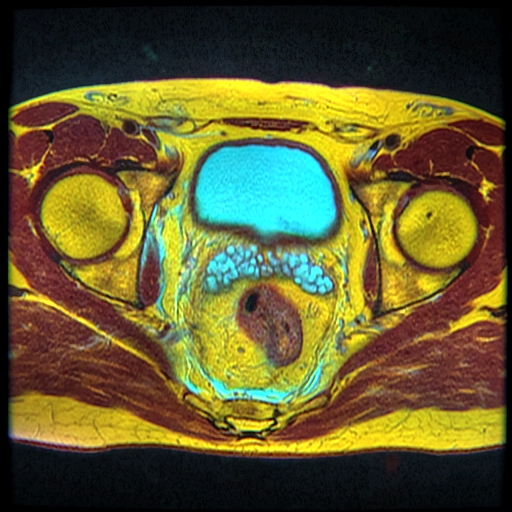
Seminal vesicles seen on an MRI scan through the pelvis. The large cyan-coloured area is the bladder, and the lobulated smaller structures below it are the vesicles.

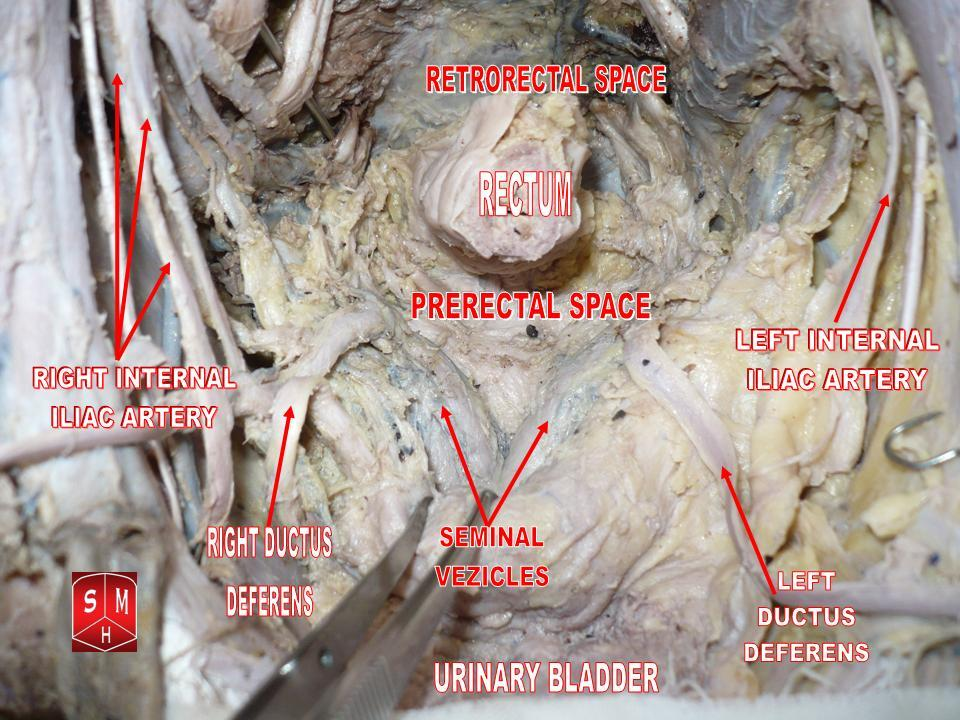
Seminal vesicles seen in a cadaveric specimen from on top, with the bladder to the bottom of the image, and the rectum at the top. Their position near the vas deferentia can be seen.

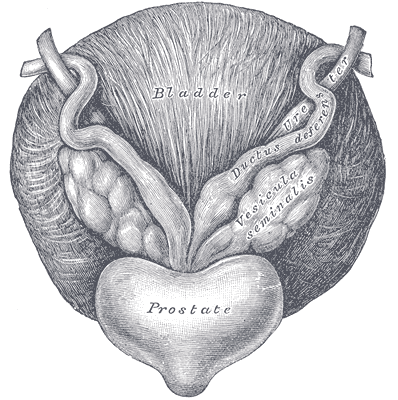
Fundus of the bladder with the vesiculae seminales.

== See also ==
- Male accessory gland infection (MAGI)
- Ejaculatory duct
- Urethra
- Prostate
- List of distinct cell types in the adult human body
