= Preaortic lymph nodes =

Preaortic lymph node
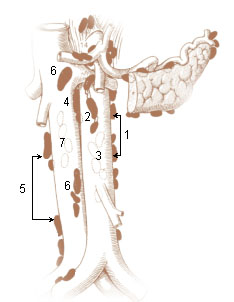
- Left lumbar lymph nodes (paraaortic lymph nodes): 1. Lateral aortic 2. Preaortic; 3. Postaortic; 4. Intermediate lumbar; Right lumbar lymph nodes (paracaval lymph nodes): 5. Lateral caval 6. Precaval; 7. Postcaval

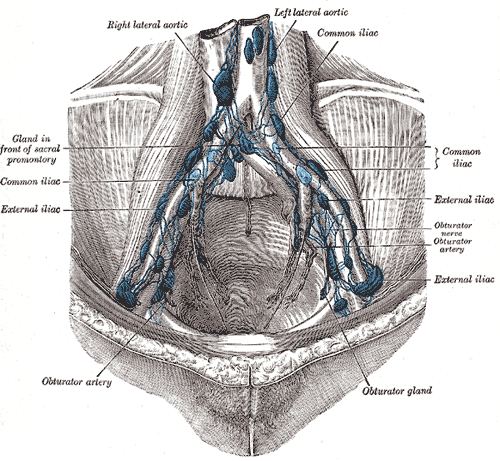
- The parietal lymph glands of the pelvis.

Details
- System: Lymphatic system
- Source: Inferior mesenteric lymph nodes
- Drains to: Primarily intestinal trunk

Identifiers
- Latin: nodi lymphoidei praeaortici

The preaortic lymph nodes lie in front of the aorta, and may be divided into celiac lymph nodes, superior mesenteric lymph nodes, and inferior mesenteric lymph nodes groups, arranged around the origins of the corresponding arteries.

The celiac lymph nodes are grouped into three sets: the gastric, hepatic and splenic lymph nodes. These groups also form their own subgroups.

The superior mesenteric lymph nodes are grouped into three sets: the mesenteric, ileocolic and mesocolic lymph nodes.

The inferior mesenteric lymph nodes have a subgroup of pararectal lymph nodes.

The preaortic lymph nodes receive a few vessels from the lateral aortic lymph nodes, but their principal afferents are derived from the organs supplied by the three arteries with which they are associated–the celiac, superior and inferior mesenteric arteries.

Some of their efferents pass to the retroaortic lymph nodes, but the majority unite to form the intestinal lymph trunk, which enters the cisterna chyli.

== Additional images ==
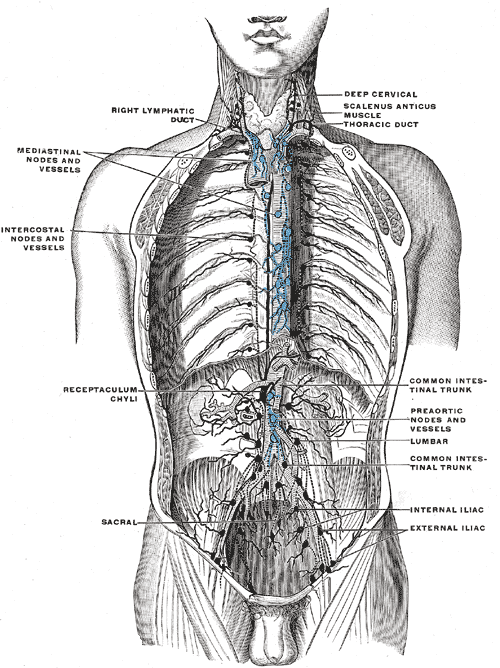
Deep lymph nodes and vessels of the thorax and abdomen.
