= Sigmoidal =

Sigmoidal or sigmoid, literally means S-shaped and can refer to:

- Sigmoid function
- Sigmoidal artery
- Sigmoid colon
