= Inferior mesenteric =

Inferior mesenteric can refer to:

- Inferior mesenteric artery
- Inferior mesenteric vein
- Inferior mesenteric lymph nodes
- Inferior mesenteric plexus
