= Vesiculodeferential artery =

Details
- From: Superior vesical artery
- Supplies: Seminal vesicles

The vesiculodeferential artery, also known as the middle vesical artery, is an artery that supplies blood to the seminal vesicles.

== Structure ==
The vesiculodeferential artery arises from the superior vesical artery, which is a branch of the umbilical artery.

== Function ==
The vesiculodeferential artery supplies oxygenated blood to the seminal vesicles.

== History ==
The vesiculodeferential artery is also known as the middle vesical artery.
