= Tracheoesophageal stripe =

Line formed by the posterior wall of the trachea and the anterior wall of the esophagus

The tracheoesophageal stripe is formed by the posterior wall of the trachea and the anterior wall of the esophagus. This line is best identified on the lateral chest x-ray. When this line is greater than 5 mm it is considered abnormal.

The most common cause of a thickened tracheoesophageal stripe is esophageal carcinoma, however, lymphadenopathy likely cannot be excluded and further evaluation with additional imaging is recommended.
