= Iliac colon =

Part of the digestive system

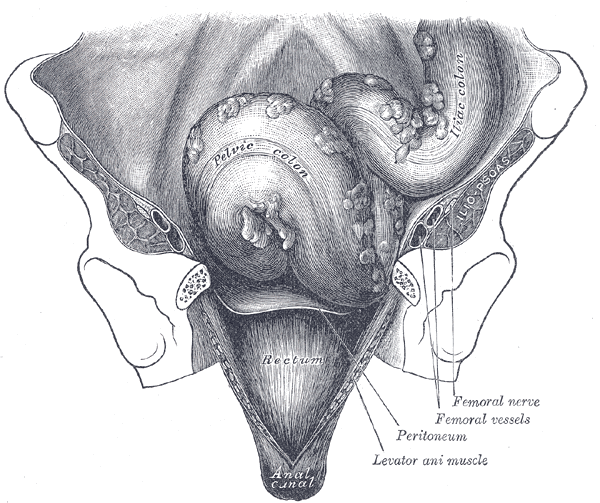
- Iliac colon, sigmoid or pelvic colon, and rectum seen from the front, after removal of pubic bones and bladder.

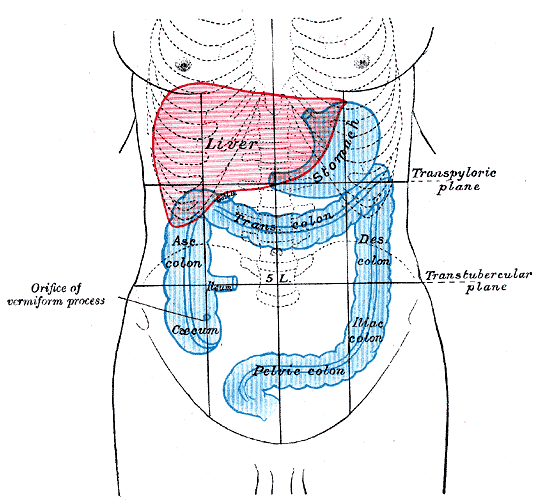
- Front of abdomen, showing surface markings for liver, stomach, and great intestine.

The iliac colon is the portion of the descending colon which is situated within the left iliac fossa (between the crest of the left ilium, and the pelvic brim). It is about 12 to 15 cm long.

It curves inferior-ward and medial-ward anterior of the iliacus and psoas muscles. It ends by transitioning into the sigmoid colon at the superior aperture of the lesser pelvis.

It is covered by peritoneum only on its anterior and lateral surfaces.

== Additional images ==
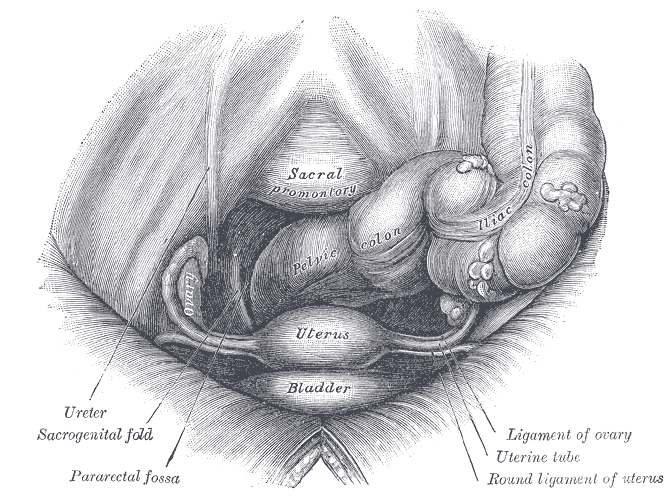
Female pelvis and its contents, seen from above and in front.
