= Inferior mesenteric lymph nodes =

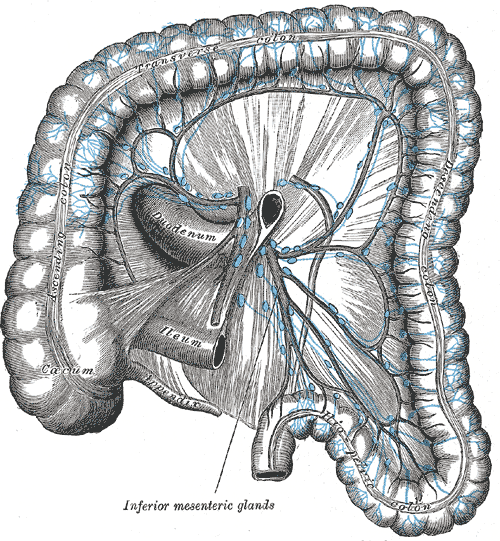
- Lymphatics of colon. (Inferior mesenteric labeled at bottom center.)

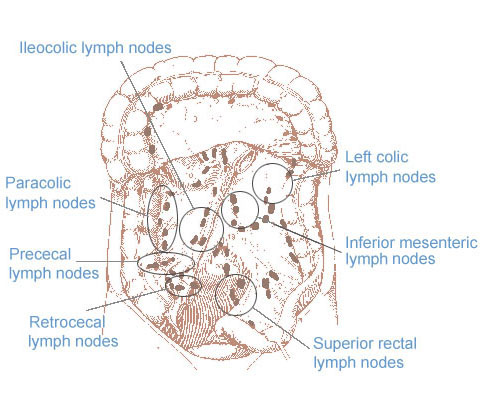

Details
- System: Lymphatic system
- Drains to: Preaortic lymph node

Identifiers
- Latin: nodi lymphoidei mesenterici inferiores

The inferior mesenteric lymph nodes consist of:

- (a) small glands on the branches of the left colic and sigmoid arteries
- (b) a group in the sigmoid mesocolon, around the superior hemorrhoidal artery
- (c) a pararectal group in contact with the muscular coat of the rectum

== Structure ==
The inferior mesenteric lymph nodes are lymph nodes present throughout the hindgut.

=== Afferents ===
The inferior mesenteric lymph nodes drain structures related to the hindgut; they receive lymph from the descending colon, sigmoid colon, and proximal part of the rectum.

=== Efferents ===
They drain into the superior mesenteric lymph nodes and ultimately to the preaortic lymph nodes. Lymph nodes surrounding the inferior mesenteric artery drain directly into the preaortic nodes.

== Clinical significance ==
Colorectal cancer may metastasise to the inferior mesenteric lymph nodes. For this reason, the inferior mesenteric artery may be removed in people with lymph node-positive cancer. This has been proposed since at least 1908, by surgeon William Ernest Miles.

== Additional images ==
Regional lymph tissue

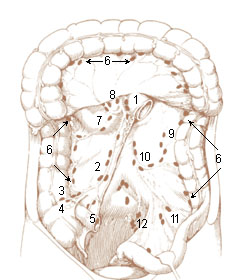
Lymph nodes of the large intestine and lower abdomen
