= Lumbar lymph trunk =

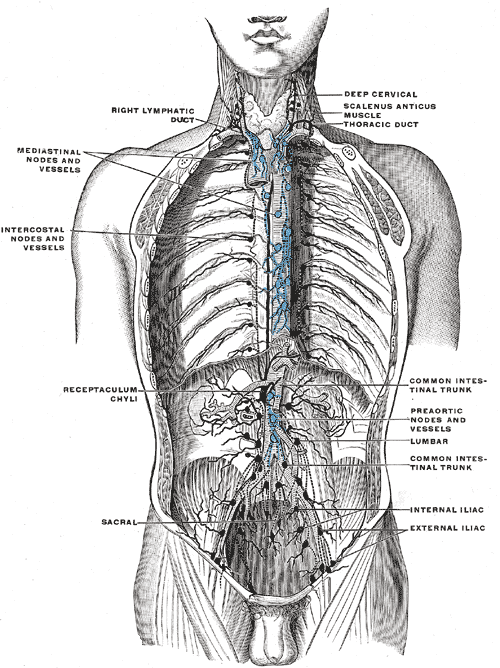
- Deep lymph nodes and vessels of the thorax and abdomen (diagrammatic). Afferent vessels are represented by continuous lines, and efferent and internodular vessels by dotted lines. (Lumbar labeled at center right.)

Details
- System: Lymphatic system
- Source: Lateral aortic lymph nodes
- Drains to: Cisterna chyli

Identifiers
- Latin: truncus lumbalis
- TA98: A12.4.01.013
- FMA: 12765

The lumbar trunks are formed by the union of the efferent vessels from the lateral aortic lymph nodes.

They receive the lymph from the lower limbs, from the walls and viscera of the pelvis, from the kidneys and suprarenal glands and the deep lymphatics of the greater part of the abdominal wall.

Ultimately, the lumbar trunks empty into the cisterna chyli, a dilatation at the beginning of the thoracic duct.
