= Sacral lymph nodes =

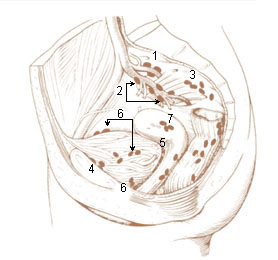
- Sacral is #3

Details
- System: Lymphatic system
- Drains to: Common iliac lymph nodes

Identifiers
- Latin: nodi lymphoidei sacrales

The sacral lymph nodes are placed in the concavity of the sacrum, in relation to the middle and lateral sacral arteries; they receive lymphatics from the rectum and posterior wall of the pelvis.
