= Intestinal lymph trunk =

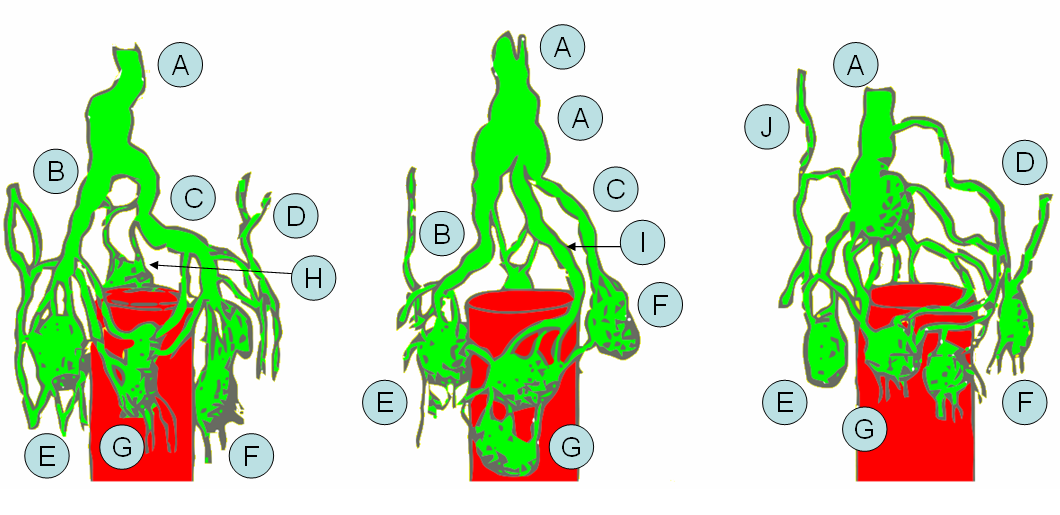
- Modes of origin of thoracic duct. a. Thoracic duct. a’. Cisterna chyli. b, c’ Efferent trunks from lateral aortic glands. d. An efferent vessel which pierces the left crus of the diaphragm. e. f. Lateral aortic glands. h. Retroaortic glands. i. Intestinal trunk. j. Descending branch from intercostal lymphatics.

Details
- System: Lymphatic system
- Drains from: Preaortic lymph node
- Drains to: Cisterna chyli

Identifiers
- Latin: trunci intestinales
- TA98: A12.4.01.014
- TA2: 5148
- FMA: 70775

The intestinal lymph trunk receives the lymph from the stomach and intestines, from the pancreas and spleen, and from the lower and front part of the liver, and empties lymph into the cisterna chyli, which in turn drains into the thoracic duct.

== Additional images ==
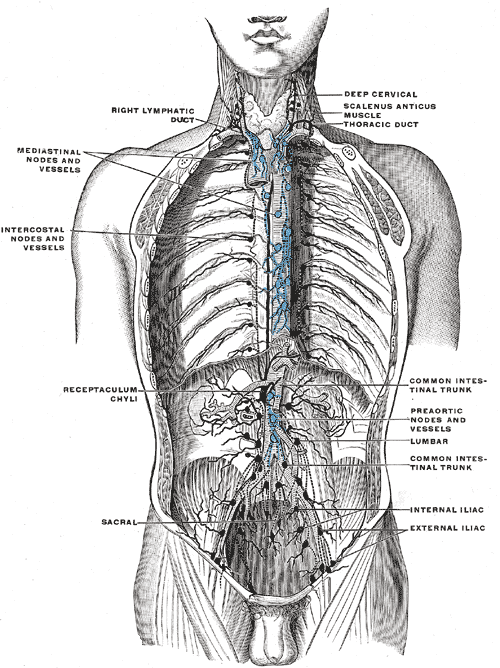
Deep lymph nodes and vessels of the thorax and abdomen (diagrammatic).
