= Pararectal lymph nodes =

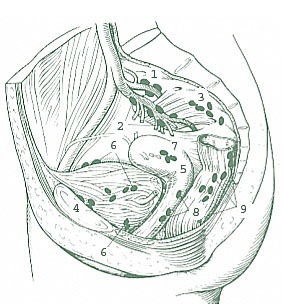
- Lymph nodes of female pelvis (pararectal is #9)

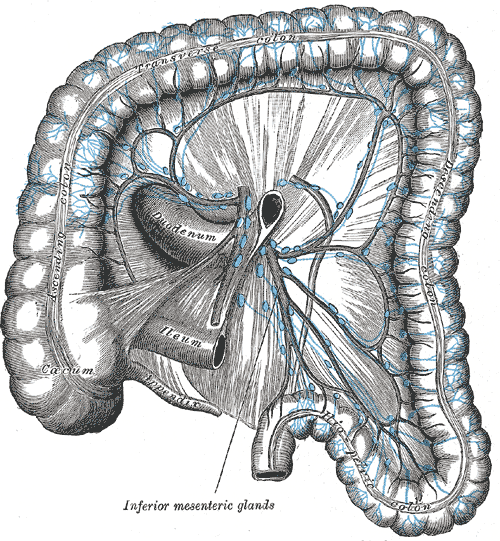
- Lymphatics of colon.

Details
- System: Lymphatic system
- Drains to: Inferior mesenteric lymph nodes

Identifiers
- Latin: nodi lymphoidei pararectales

The pararectal lymph nodes are lymph nodes that are in contact with the muscular surface of the rectum.

== Structure ==
The pararectal lymph nodes are located on the left and right of the rectum. Their efferent lymph ducts pass to the pre-aortic lymph nodes.

== Function ==
The pararectal lymph nodes drain the descending iliac and sigmoid parts of the large intestine, and the upper part of the rectum.

== See also ==
- Pectinate line
