= Internal iliac lymph nodes =

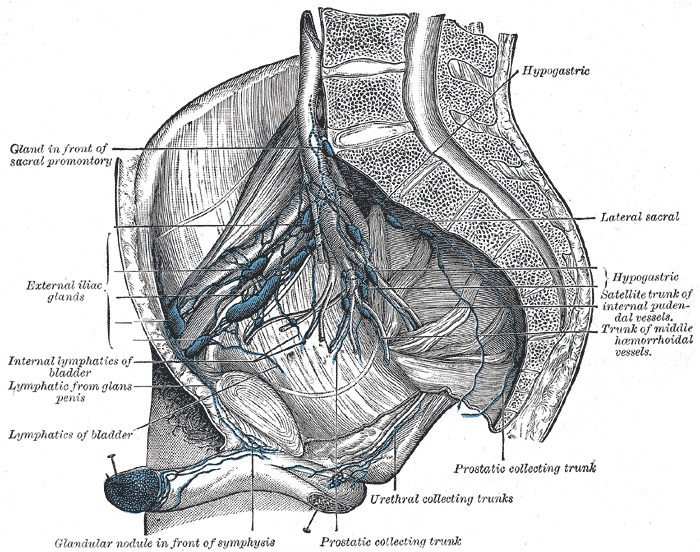
- Iliopelvic glands, lateral view. (Hypogastric labeled at upper right.)

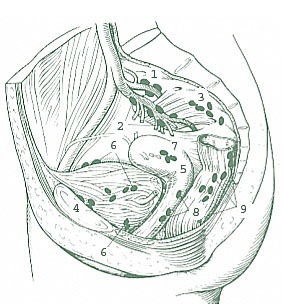
- Internal Iliac Nodes: 1. Superior gluteal 2. Inferior gluteal 3. Sacral; Perivesical Lymph Nodes: 4. Prevesicular; 5. Postvesicular; 6. Lateral vesicular 7. Parauterine; 8. Paravaginal; 9. Anorectal (pararectal)

Details
- System: Lymphatic system
- Drains to: Common iliac lymph nodes

Identifiers
- Latin: nodi lymphoidei iliaci interni
- FMA: 16654

The internal iliac lymph nodes (or hypogastric lymph nodes) surround the internal iliac artery and its branches (the hypogastric vessels). They receive the lymphatics corresponding to the distribution of the branches of it, i. e., they receive lymphatics from all the pelvic viscera, from the deeper parts of the perineum, including the membranous and cavernous portions of the urethra, and from the buttock and back of the thigh. The internal iliac lymph nodes also drain the superior half of the rectum, above the pectinate line.

It does not receive lymph from the ovary or testis, which drain to the paraaortic lymph nodes.

== Additional images ==
Regional lymph tissue

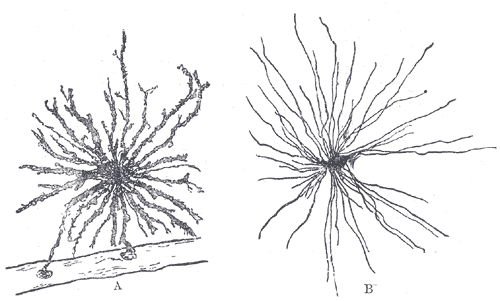
Deep lymph nodes and vessels of the thorax and abdomen.

== See also ==
- External iliac lymph nodes
- pararectal lymph nodes
