= External iliac lymph nodes =

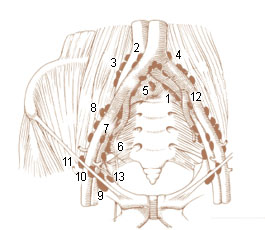
- Common Iliac Lymph Nodes: 1. Medial common iliac 2. Intermediate common iliac 3. Lateral common iliac 4. Subaortic common iliac 5. Common iliac nodes of promontory; External Iliac Lymph Nodes: 6. Medial external iliac 7. Intermediate external iliac 8. Lateral external iliac 9. Medial lacunar (femoral); 10. Intermediate lacunar (femoral); 11. Lateral lacunar (femoral); 12. Interiliac external iliac 13. Obturator (external iliac obturatory)

Details
- System: Lymphatic system
- Source: Inguinal lymph node
- Drains to: Common iliac lymph nodes

Identifiers
- Latin: nodi lymphoidei iliaci externi
- FMA: 16646

The external iliac lymph nodes are lymph nodes, from eight to ten in number, that lie along the external iliac vessels.

They are arranged in three groups, one on the lateral, another on the medial, and a third on the anterior aspect of the vessels; the third group is, however, sometimes absent.

Their principal afferents are derived from the inguinal lymph nodes, the deep lymphatics of the abdominal wall below the umbilicus and of the adductor region of the thigh, and the lymphatics from the glans penis, glans clitoridis, the membranous urethra, the prostate, the fundus of the urinary bladder, the cervix uteri, and upper part of the vagina.

== Additional images ==
Regional lymph tissue

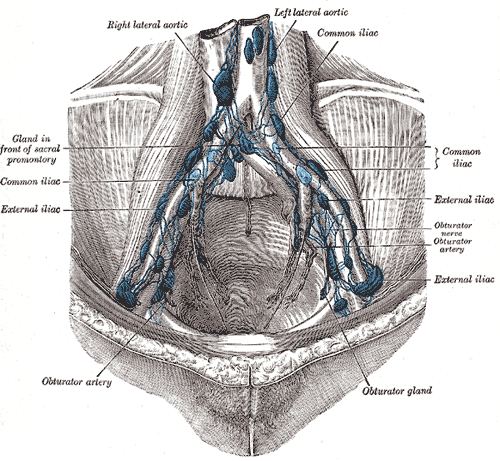
The parietal lymph glands of the pelvis.

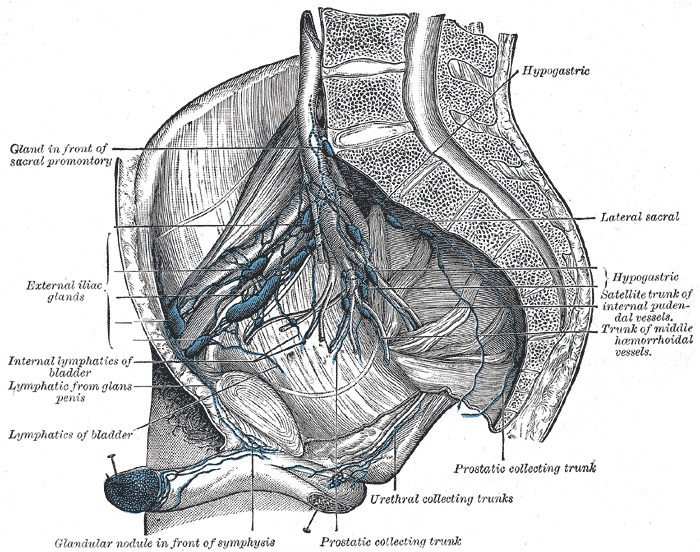
Iliopelvic glands (lateral view).

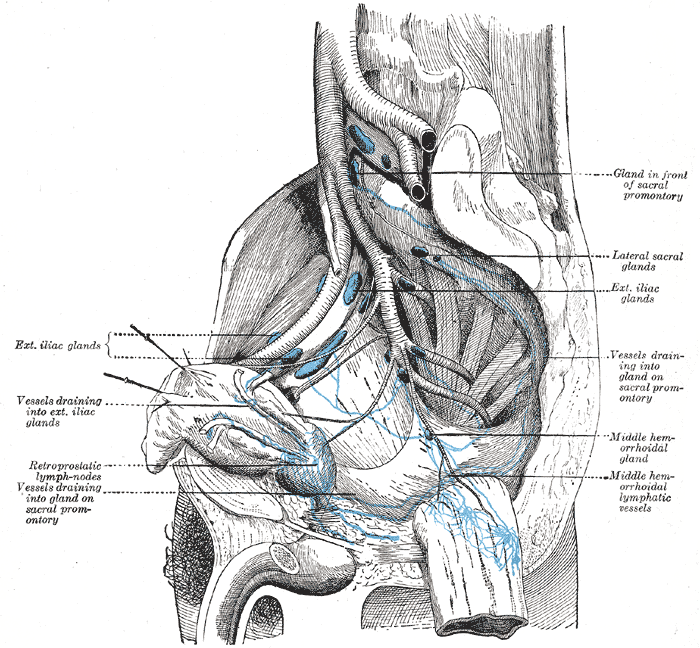
Lymphatics of the prostate.

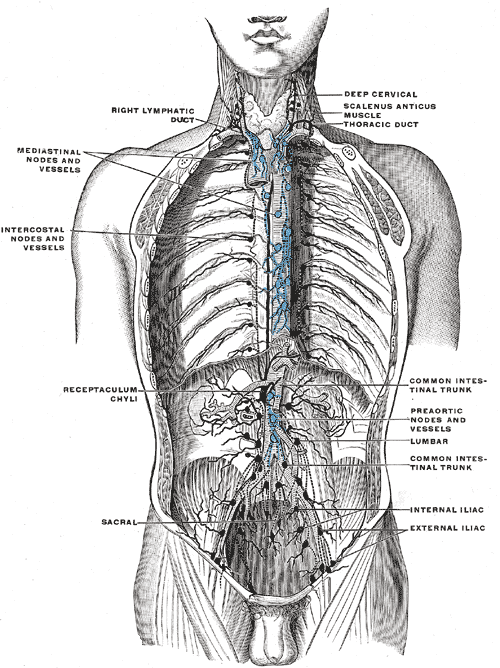
Deep lymph nodes and vessels of the thorax and abdomen.

== See also ==
- Internal iliac lymph nodes
