= Mucin 21, cell surface associated =

Protein-coding gene in the species Homo sapiens

MUC21

Identifiers
- Aliases: MUC21, C6orf205, KMQK697, MUC-21, bCX31G15.2, mucin 21, cell surface associated
- External IDs: OMIM: 616991; HomoloGene: 134043; GeneCards: MUC21; OMA:MUC21 - orthologs
RNA expression pattern
Bgee	Human / Mouse (ortholog); Top expressed in: vagina; thymus; minor salivary glands; right coronary artery; body of stomach; fundus; upper lobe of left lung; canal of the cervix; right uterine tube; left uterine tube / n/a; More reference expression data
BioGPS	n/a
Orthologs
Species	Human	Mouse
Entrez	394263	n/a
Ensembl	n/a	n/a
UniProt	Q5SSG8	n/a
RefSeq (mRNA)	NM_001010909; NM_001322370; NM_001322371	n/a
RefSeq (protein)	NP_001010909; NP_001309299; NP_001309300	n/a
Location (UCSC)	n/a	n/a
PubMed search		n/a
- Wikidata
View/Edit Human

Mucin 21, cell surface associated is a protein that in humans is encoded by the MUC21 gene.
