= Jugulo-omohyoid lymph node =

Juguloomohyoid lymph node
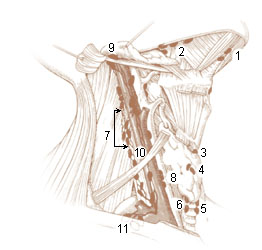
- Deep Lymph Nodes: 1. Submental; 2. Submandibular (Submaxillary); Anterior Cervical Lymph Nodes (Deep): 3. Prelaryngeal; 4. Thyroid; 5. Pretracheal; 6. Paratracheal; Deep Cervical Lymph Nodes: 7. Lateral jugular 8. Anterior jugular 9. Jugulodigastric; Inferior Deep Cervical Lymph Nodes: 10. Juguloomohyoid; 11. Supraclavicular (scalene)

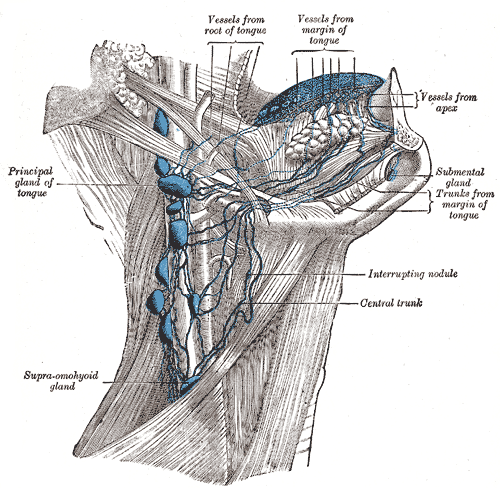
- Lymphatics of the tongue (jugulo-omohyoid lymph node visible but not labeled)

Details
- System: Lymphatic system

Identifiers
- Latin: nodus lymphoideus juguloomohyoideu

The juguloomohyoid lymph node (tongue node) is related to the intermediate tendon of the omohyoid muscle. It is designated as one of the deep cervical lymph nodes. As it is associated with the lymph drainage of the tongue if enlarged, it can be a sign of a tongue carcinoma.
