= Sigmoid arteries =

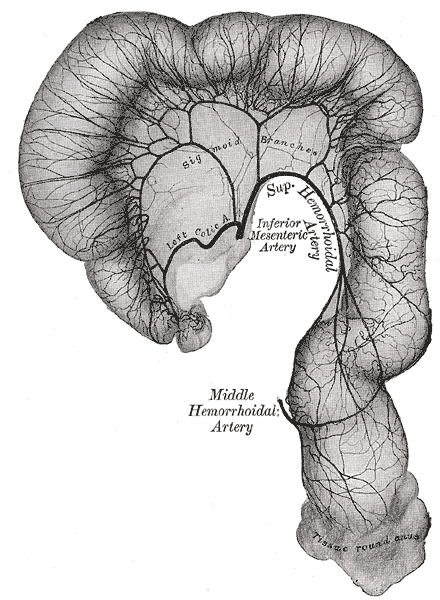
- Sigmoid colon and rectum, showing distribution of branches of inferior mesenteric artery and their anastomoses

- The inferior mesenteric artery and its branches (sigmoid arteries labeled at bottom right)

Details

Identifiers
- Latin: arteriae sigmoideae
- TA98: A12.2.12.072
- TA2: 4295
- FMA: 14830

The sigmoid arteries are 2–5 branches of the inferior mesenteric artery that are distributed to the distal descending colon and the sigmoid colon.

== Anatomy ==
=== Course and relations ===
The sigmoid arteries course obliquely inferior-ward and to the left, passing posterior to the peritoneum and in anterior to the psoas major, ureter, and Gonadal artery.

=== Anastomoses ===
The sigmoid arteries anastomose with the left colic superiorly, and with the superior rectal artery inferiorly.
