= Retroaortic lymph nodes =

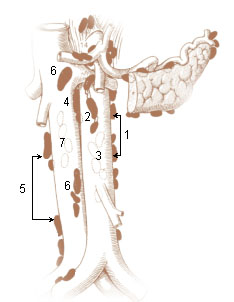
- Left Lumbar Lymph Nodes (Paraaortic Lymph Nodes): 1. Lateral aortic 2. Preaortic; 3. Postaortic; 4. Intermediate Lumbar; Right Lumbar Lymph Nodes (Paracaval Lymph Nodes): 5. Lateral caval 6. Precaval; 7. Postcaval

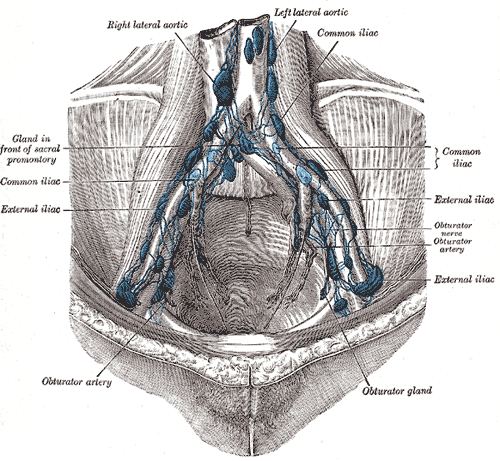
- The parietal lymph glands of the pelvis.

Details
- System: Lymphatic system
- Source: Lateral aortic lymph nodes, preaortic glands
- Drains to: Cisterna chyli

Identifiers
- Latin: nodi lymphoidei retroaortici

The retroaortic lymph nodes (or postaortic lymph nodes) are placed below the cisterna chyli, on the bodies of the third and fourth lumbar vertebrae.

They receive lymphatic trunks from the lateral and preaortic glands, while their efferents end in the cisterna chyli.
