= Splenic lymph node =

Splenic lymph nodes
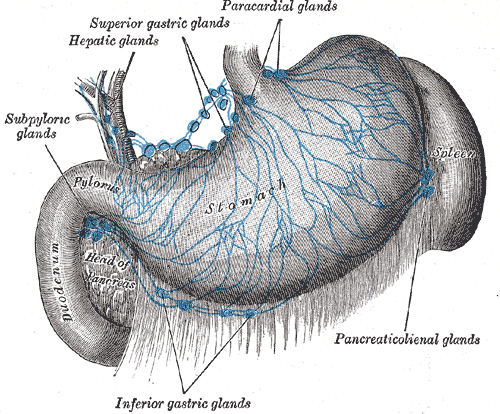
- Lymphatics of stomach, etc.

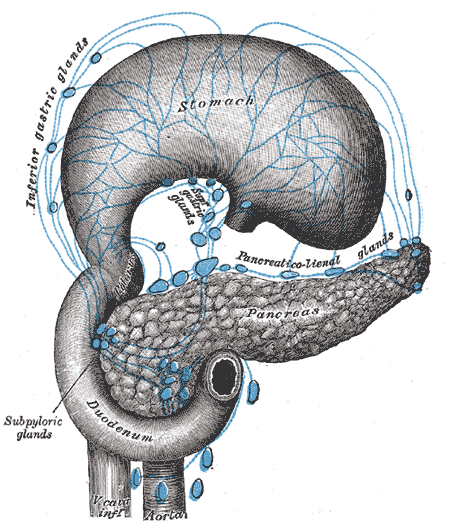
- Lymphatics of stomach, etc. The stomach has been turned upward.

Details
- System: Lymphatic system
- Drains to: Celiac lymph nodes

Identifiers
- Latin: nodi lymphoidei splenici
- FMA: 66187

The splenic lymph nodes are found at the splenic hilum and in relation to the tail of the pancreas (pancreaticolienal lymph nodes).

Their afferents are derived from the stomach, spleen, and pancreas. The splenic lymph nodes empty into the suprapancreatic, infrapancreatic and omental lymph nodes, which then drain to the coeliac nodes and cisterna chyli.

== Additional images ==
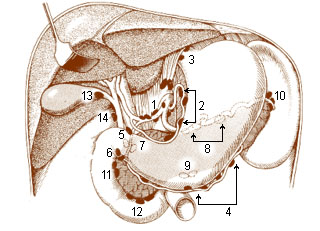
Visceral nodes of the abdominal cavity
