= Cisterna chyli =

Component of the lymphoid system

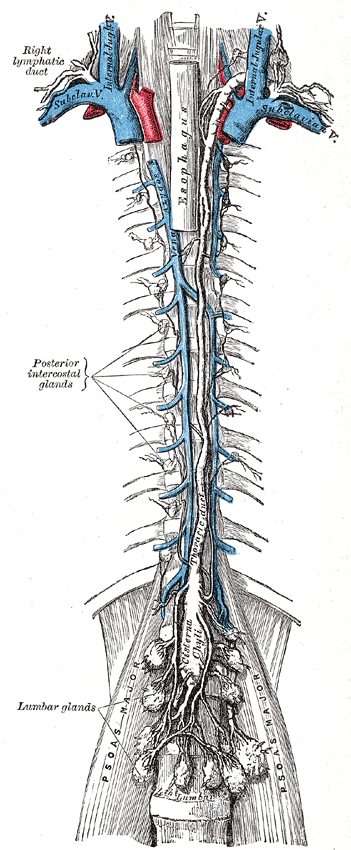
- Cisterna chyli is the white bulb in the center near the bottom.

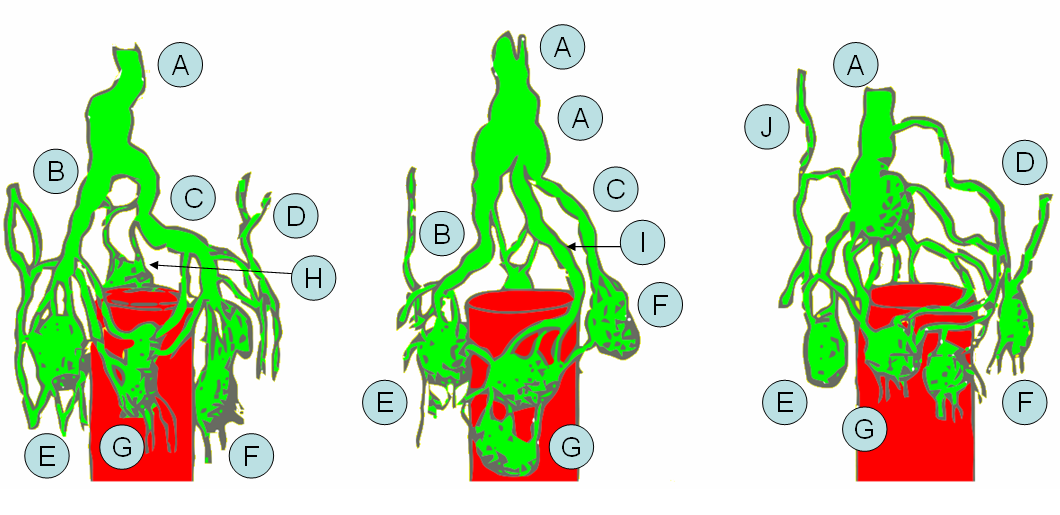
- Modes of origin of thoracic duct. a. Thoracic duct. a’. Cisterna chyli. b, c’ Efferent trunks from lateral aortic glands. d. An efferent vessel which pierces the left crus of the diaphragm. e. f. Lateral aortic glands. h. Retroaortic glands. i. Intestinal trunk. j. Descending branch from intercostal lymphatics.

Details
- System: Lymphatic system
- Source: Intestinal trunk, lumbar trunks, retroaortic lymph nodes
- Drains to: Thoracic duct

Identifiers
- Latin: cisterna chyli
- TA98: A12.4.01.012
- TA2: 5145
- FMA: 5835

The cisterna chyli or receptaculum chyli (chy·li pronounced: ˈkī-ˌlī) is a dilated sac at the lower end of the thoracic duct in most mammals into which lymph from the intestinal trunk and two lumbar lymphatic trunks flow. It receives fatty chyle from the intestines and thus acts as a conduit for the lipid products of digestion. It is the most common drainage trunk of most of the body's lymphatics. The cisterna chyli is a retroperitoneal structure.

== Structure ==
In humans, the cisterna chyli is located posterior to the abdominal aorta on the anterior aspect of the bodies of the first and second lumbar vertebrae (L1 and L2). There it forms the beginning of the primary lymph vessel, the thoracic duct, which transports lymph and chyle from the abdomen via the aortic opening of the diaphragm up to the junction of left subclavian vein and internal jugular veins.

== Other animals ==
In dogs, the cisterna chyli is located to the left and often ventral to the aorta; in cats it is left and dorsal; in guinea pigs it runs to the left and drains into the left innominate vein.

== Gallery ==
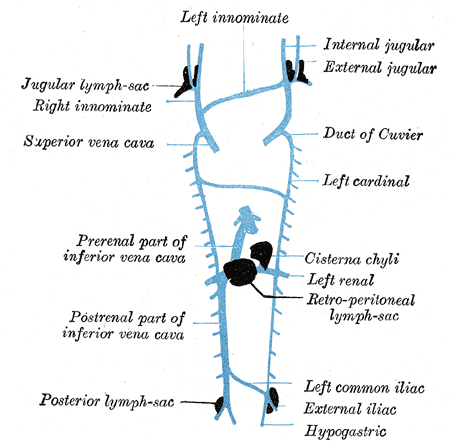
Scheme showing relative positions of primary lymph sacs.

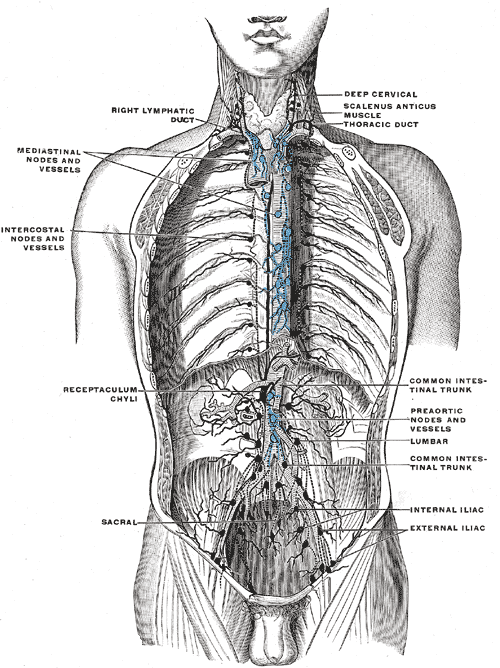
Deep lymph nodes and vessels of the thorax and abdomen (diagrammatic).

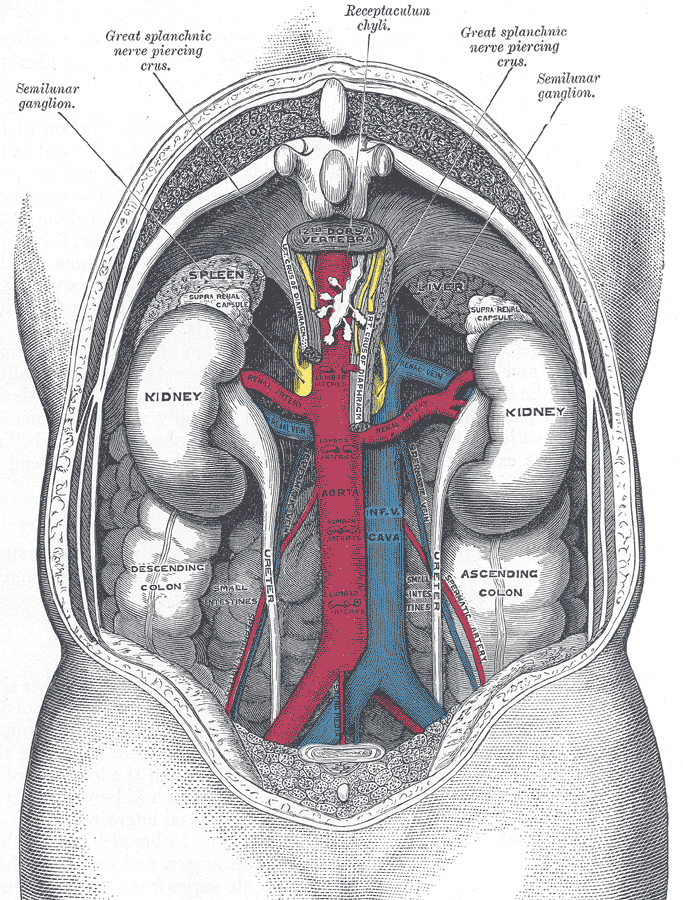
The relations of the viscera and large vessels of the abdomen.

Lymphatic system. Thymus and spleen are clearly visible.

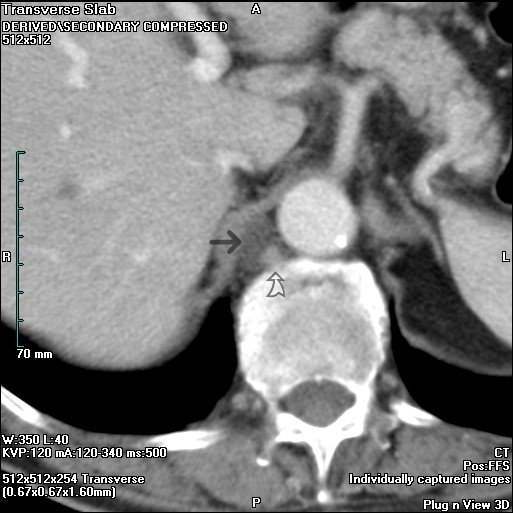
Cisterna chyli (arrow), adjacent to the azygous vein (curved arrow). Normally not visible on CT; this is an 83 male who had a CT for follow-up of gastrointestinal stromal tumour.

== See also ==
- Lymphatic system
