= External iliac vessels =

The external iliac vessels are:

- External iliac artery
- External iliac vein
