= Common iliac lymph nodes =

Lymph nodes found in the pelvis

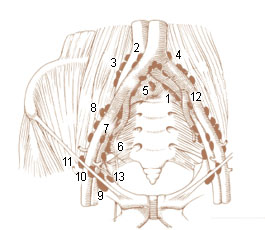
- Common Iliac Lymph Nodes: 1. Medial common iliac 2. Intermediate common iliac 3. Lateral common iliac 4. Subaortic common iliac 5. Common iliac nodes of promontory; External Iliac Lymph Nodes: 6. Medial external iliac 7. Intermediate external iliac 8. Lateral external iliac 9. Medial lacunar (femoral); 10. Intermediate lacunar (femoral); 11. Lateral lacunar (femoral); 12. Interiliac external iliac 13. Obturator (external iliac obturatory)

- Regional lymph tissue

Details
- System: Lymphatic system
- Source: Internal iliac lymph nodes, external iliac lymph nodes
- Drains to: Lateral aortic lymph nodes

Identifiers
- Latin: nodi lymphoidei iliaci communes
- FMA: 12806

The common iliac lymph nodes, four to six in number, are grouped behind and on the sides of the common iliac artery, one or two being placed below the bifurcation of the aorta, in front of the fifth lumbar vertebra.

They drain chiefly the hypogastric and external iliac glands, and their efferents pass to the lateral aortic glands.
