= Gastric lymph nodes =

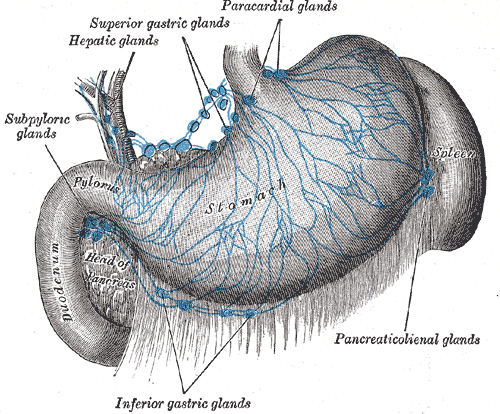
- Lymphatics of stomach and surrounding structures

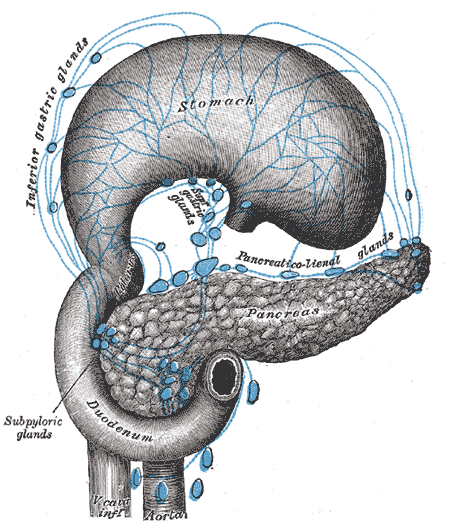
- Lymphatics of stomach and surrounding structures. The stomach has been turned upward

Details
- System: Lymphatic system
- Drains to: Celiac lymph nodes

Identifiers
- Latin: nodi lymphoidei gastrici

The gastric lymph nodes are lymph nodes (also known as lymph glands) which drain the stomach and consist of two sets, superior and inferior:

- The superior gastric lymph nodes (Latin: lymphoglandulæ gastricæ superiores) accompany the left gastric artery and are divisible into three groups:
  - Upper, on the stem of the artery;
  - Lower, accompanying the descending branches of the artery along the cardiac half of the lesser curvature of the stomach, between the two layers of the lesser omentum;
  - Paracardial outlying members of the gastric lymph nodes, disposed in a manner comparable to a chain of beads around the neck of the stomach. They receive their afferents from the stomach; their efferents pass to the celiac group of preaortic lymph nodes.
- The inferior gastric lymph nodes (Latin: lymphoglandulæ gastricæ inferiores; right gastroepiploic lymph nodes), four to seven in number, lie between the two layers of the greater omentum along the pyloric half of the greater curvature of the stomach.

== Additional images ==
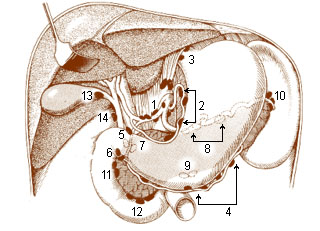
Lymph nodes of the abdominal cavity
