= Sigmoid colon =

Section of the large intestine closest to the rectum and anus

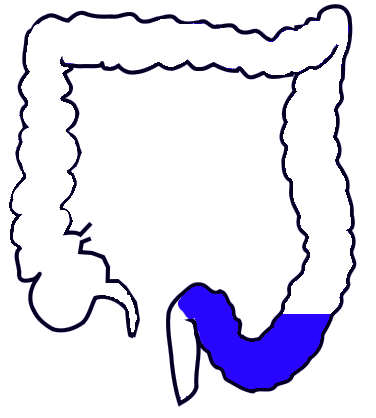
- Drawing of colon seen from front (sigmoid colon coloured blue)

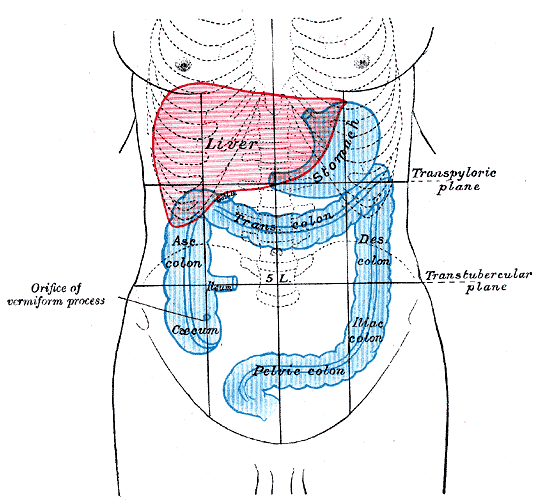
- Front of abdomen, showing surface markings for liver, stomach and large intestine

Details
- Precursor: Hindgut
- Part of: Large intestine
- System: Digestive system
- Artery: Sigmoid branches of inferior mesenteric artery, sigmoid arteries, internal iliac artery
- Nerve: Inferior mesenteric ganglia and sacral nerve

Identifiers
- Latin: colon sigmoideum
- MeSH: D012809
- TA98: A05.7.03.007
- TA2: 2987
- FMA: 14548

The sigmoid colon (or pelvic colon) is the part of the large intestine that is closest to the rectum and anus. It forms a loop that averages about 35–40 centimetres (14–16 in) in length. The loop is typically shaped like a Greek letter sigma (ς) or Latin letter S (thus sigma + -oid). This part of the colon normally lies within the pelvis, but due to its freedom of movement it is liable to be displaced into the abdominal cavity.

== Structure ==
The sigmoid colon begins at the superior aperture of the lesser pelvis, where it is continuous with the iliac colon, and passes transversely across the front of the sacrum to the right side of the pelvis.

It then curves on itself and turns toward the left to reach the middle line at the level of the third piece of the sacrum, where it bends downward and ends in the rectum.

Its function is to expel solid and gaseous waste from the gastrointestinal tract. The curving path it takes toward the anus allows it to store gas in the superior arched portion, enabling the colon to expel gas without excreting feces simultaneously.

=== Coverings ===
The sigmoid colon is completely surrounded by peritoneum (and thus is not retroperitoneal), which forms a mesentery (sigmoid mesocolon), which diminishes in length from the center toward the ends of the loop, where it disappears, so that the loop is fixed at its junctions with the iliac colon and rectum, but enjoys a considerable range of movement in its central portion.

=== Nerve supply ===
Pelvic splanchnic nerves are the primary source for parasympathetic innervation. Lumbar splanchnic nerves provide sympathetic innervation via the inferior mesenteric ganglion.

=== Relations ===
Behind the sigmoid colon are the external iliac vessels, ovary, obturator nerve, the left piriformis, and left sacral plexus of nerves.

In front, it is separated from the bladder in the male, and the uterus in the female, by some coils of the small intestine.

== Clinical significance ==
Diverticulosis often occurs in the sigmoid colon in association with increased intraluminal pressure and focal weakness in the colonic wall. It is a common cause of hematochezia.

Volvulus occurs when a portion of the bowel twists around its mesentery, which can lead to obstruction and infarction. Volvulus in the elderly commonly occurs in the sigmoid colon, whereas in infants and children it is more likely to occur in the midgut. This may correct itself spontaneously or the rotation may continue until the blood supply of the gut is cut off completely.

There are pioneering sonographic examinations to assess the sigmoid colon mesentery in living fetuses.

== Additional images ==
1: Ascending colon
2: Transverse colon
3: Descending colon
4: Sigmoid colon
5: Rectum

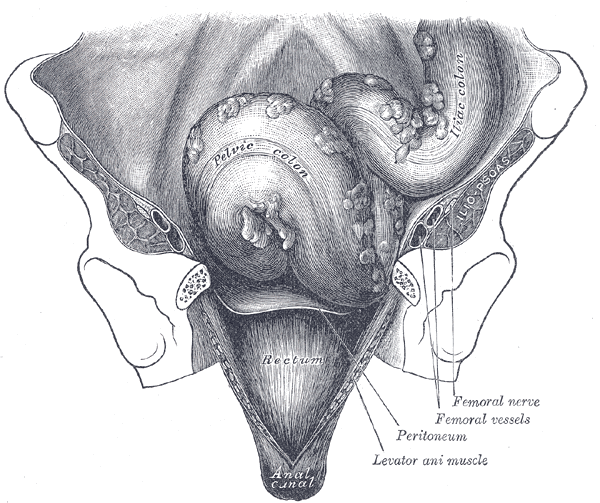
Iliac colon, sigmoid or pelvic colon, and rectum seen from the front, after removal of pubic bones and bladder

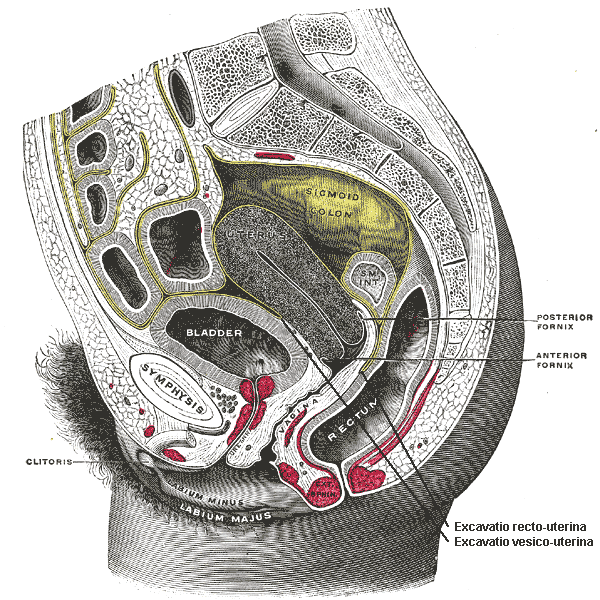
Sagittal section of the lower part of a female trunk, right segment
