= Hepatic lymph nodes =

Lymph nodes on the common hepatic artery

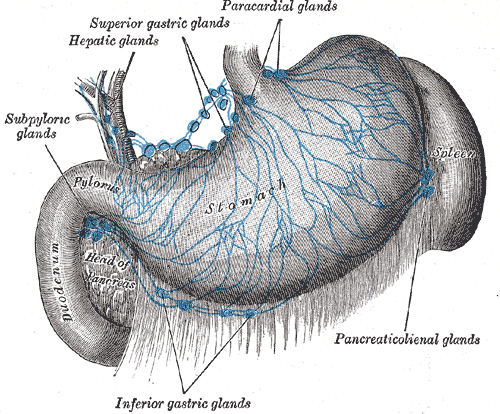
- Lymphatics of stomach, etc.

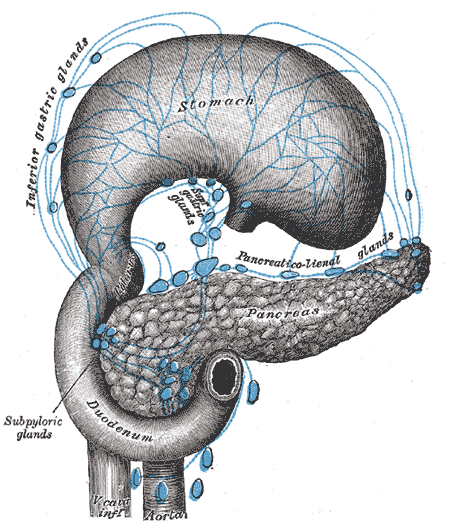
- Lymphatics of stomach, etc. The stomach has been turned upward.

Details
- System: Lymphatic system
- Drains to: Celiac lymph nodes

Identifiers
- Latin: nodi lymphoidei hepatici lymphoglandulae hepaticae

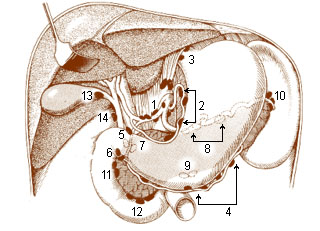
Visceral nodes of the abdominal cavity

The hepatic lymph nodes consist of the following groups:

- (a) hepatic, on the stem of the hepatic artery, and extending upward along the common bile duct, between the two layers of the lesser omentum, as far as the porta hepatis; the cystic gland, a member of this group, is placed near the neck of the gall-bladder;
- (b) subpyloric, four or five in number, in close relation to the bifurcation of the gastroduodenal artery, in the angle between the superior and descending parts of the duodenum; an outlying member of this group is sometimes found above the duodenum on the right gastric (pyloric) artery.

The lymph nodes of the hepatic chain receive afferents from the stomach, duodenum, liver, gall-bladder, and pancreas; their efferents join the celiac group of preaortic lymph nodes.

== Cancer prognosis and treatment ==
Hepatic artery lymph nodes are commonly resected during a Whipple procedure. In a Whipple procedure, outcomes favored those who had no hepatic artery lymph node involvement.

A particularly large hepatic artery lymph node, positioned on the anterior aspect of the common hepatic artery, is thought to play an important role in pancreatic cancer. When metastatic disease is identified in the hepatic artery lymph node during pancreatic cancer surgery, longterm outcomes are worse.
