= Superior mesenteric lymph nodes =

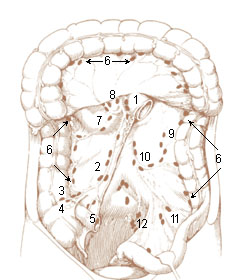
- Lymph nodes of the large intestine and lower abdomen (superior mesenteric is #1)

Details
- System: Lymphatic system
- Drains to: Preaortic lymph node

Identifiers
- Latin: nodi lymphoidei mesenterici superiores

The superior mesenteric lymph nodes may be divided into three principal groups:

- mesenteric lymph nodes
- ileocolic lymph nodes
- mesocolic lymph nodes

== Structure ==
=== Mesenteric lymph nodes ===
The mesenteric lymph nodes or mesenteric glands are one of the three principal groups of superior mesenteric lymph nodes and lie between the layers of the mesentery.

They number from one hundred to one hundred and fifty, and are sited as two main groups:

- one ileocolic group lying close to the wall of the small intestine, among the terminal twigs of the superior mesenteric artery;
- a second larger mesocolic group placed in relation to the loops and primary branches of the vessels.

=== Ileocolic lymph nodes ===
The ileocolic lymph nodes, from ten to twenty in number, form a chain around the ileocolic artery, but tend to subdivide into two groups, one near the duodenum and the other on the lower part of the trunk of the artery. Where the vessel divides into its terminal branches the chain is broken up into several groups:

- (a) ileal, in relation to the ileal branch of the artery;
- (b) anterior ileocolic, usually of three glands, in the ileocolic fold, near the wall of the cecum;
- (c) posterior ileocolic, mostly placed in the angle between the ileum and the colon, but partly lying behind the cecum at its junction with the ascending colon;
- (d) a single gland, between the layers of the mesenteriole of the appendix;
- (e) right colic, along the medial side of the ascending colon.

=== Mesocolic lymph nodes ===
The mesocolic lymph nodes are numerous, and lie between the layers of the transverse mesocolon, in close relation to the transverse colon; they are best developed in the neighborhood of the right and left colic flexures.

One or two small glands are occasionally seen along the trunk of the right colic artery and others are found in relation to the trunk and branches of the middle colic artery.

== Function ==
The superior mesenteric glands receive lymph from the jejunum, ileum, cecum, vermiform process, and the ascending and transverse parts of the colon; lymph drains into the preaortic glands.

== Additional images ==
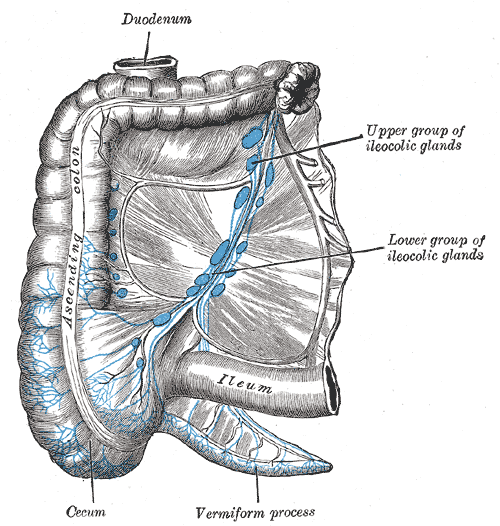
The lymphatics of cecum and vermiform process from the front.

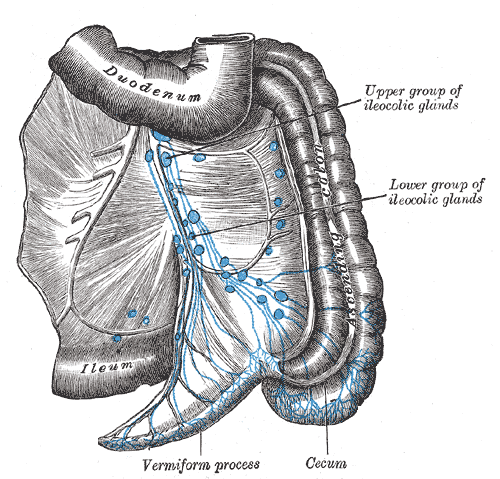
The lymphatics of cecum and vermiform process from behind.
