= Celiac lymph nodes =

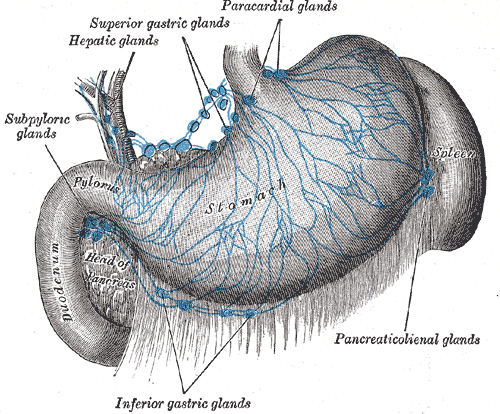
- Lymphatics of stomach, etc.

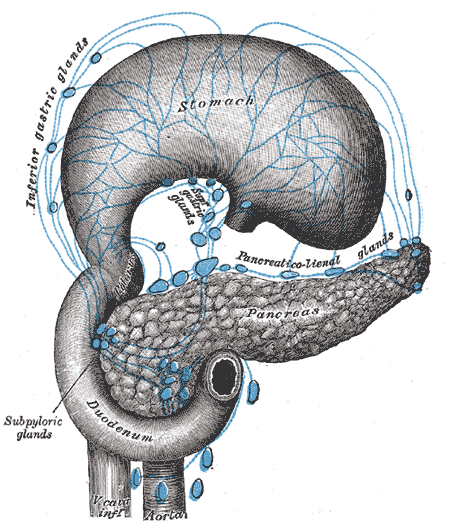
- Lymphatics of stomach, etc. The stomach has been turned upward.

Details
- System: Lymphatic system
- Drains to: Preaortic lymph node

Identifiers
- Latin: nodi lymphoidei coeliaci

The celiac lymph nodes are associated with the branches of the celiac artery. Other lymph nodes in the abdomen are associated with the superior and inferior mesenteric arteries. The celiac lymph nodes are grouped into three sets: the gastric, hepatic and splenic lymph nodes. They receive lymph from the stomach, duodenum, pancreas, spleen, liver, and gall bladder.

== Additional images ==
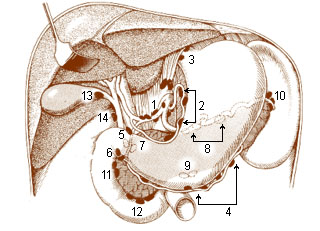
Lymph nodes of the abdominal cavity
