= Abdominal pain =

Stomach aches

- Other names: Stomach ache, tummy ache, belly ache, belly pain, gastralgia, stomach pain
- Abdominal pain can be characterized by the region it affects.
- Specialty: Gastroenterology, general surgery, obstetrics and gynecology, urology, emergency medicine
- Complications: Anorexia
- Causes: Serious: Appendicitis, perforated stomach ulcer, pancreatitis, ruptured diverticulitis, ovarian torsion, volvulus, ruptured aortic aneurysm, lacerated spleen or liver, ischemic colitis, ischaemic myocardial conditions Common: Gastroenteritis, irritable bowel syndrome, indigestion

Abdominal pain, also known as a stomach ache, is a symptom associated with both non-serious and serious medical issues. Since the abdomen contains most of the body's vital organs, it can be an indicator of a wide variety of diseases. Given that, approaching the examination of a person and planning of a differential diagnosis is extremely important.

Common causes of pain in the abdomen include gastroenteritis and irritable bowel syndrome. About 15% of people have a more serious underlying condition such as appendicitis, leaking or ruptured abdominal aortic aneurysm, diverticulitis, or ectopic pregnancy. In a third of cases, the exact cause is unclear.

== Signs and symptoms ==
The onset of abdominal pain can be abrupt, quick, or gradual. Sudden onset pain happens nearly instantaneously. Rapidly onset pain starts mild and gets worse over the next few minutes. Pain that gradually intensifies only after several hours or even days has passed is referred to as gradual onset pain.

One can describe abdominal pain as either continuous or sporadic and as cramping, dull, or aching. The characteristic of cramping abdominal pain is that it comes in brief waves, builds to a peak, and then abruptly stops for a period during which there is no more pain. The pain flares up and off periodically. The most common cause of persistent dull or aching abdominal pain is edema or distention of the wall of a hollow viscus. A dull or aching pain may also be felt due to a stretch in the liver and spleen capsules.

== Causes ==
The most frequent reasons for abdominal pain are gastroenteritis (13%), irritable bowel syndrome (8%), urinary tract problems (5%), inflammation of the stomach (5%) and constipation (5%). In about 30% of cases, the cause is not determined. About 10% of cases have a more serious cause including gallbladder (gallstones or biliary dyskinesia) or pancreas problems (4%), diverticulitis (3%), appendicitis (2%) and cancer (1%). More common in those who are older, ischemic colitis, mesenteric ischemia, and abdominal aortic aneurysms are other serious causes.

=== Acute abdomen ===
Acute abdomen is a condition where there is a sudden onset of severe abdominal pain requiring immediate recognition and management of the underlying cause. The underlying cause may involve infection, inflammation, vascular occlusion or bowel obstruction.

The pain may elicit nausea and vomiting, abdominal distention, fever and signs of shock. A common condition associated with acute abdominal pain is appendicitis. Here is a list of acute abdomen causes:

=== Surgical causes ===	Source: ==== Inflammatory ==== : Infections such as appendicitis, cholecystitis, pancreatitis, pyelonephritis, Peritonitis, pelvic inflammatory disease, hepatitis, mesenteric adenitis, or a subdiaphragmatic abscess.; Perforation of a peptic ulcer, a diverticulum, or the caecum.; Complications of inflammatory bowel disease, such as Crohn's disease or ulcerative colitis.; ==== Mechanical ==== : Small bowel obstruction secondary to adhesions caused by previous surgeries, intussusception, hernias, benign or malignant neoplasms.; Large bowel obstruction caused by colorectal cancer, inflammatory bowel disease, volvulus, fecal impaction, or hernia.; ==== Vascular ==== : occlusive intestinal ischemia, usually caused by thromboembolism of the superior Mesenteric artery.; ==== Referred pain ==== Source: Viscero-visceral referral: happens when one organ with afferent nerves close to another organ is sensitized or inflamed (in this case any of the abdominal viscera); Viscero-somatic referral: any pain in the viscera that causes pain in the muscle, bone, and skin (of the abdomen in case of abdominal pain); Somatic-visceral referral: pain in the skin, muscles, and bone that causes referred pain in the viscera (of the abdomen such as the stomach, kidneys, bladder, etc.)
=== Medical causes ===	Source: Acute pancreatitis. Sickle cell anemia. Diabetic ketoacidosis (DKA). Adrenal crisis. Pyelonephritis. Lead poisoning. Familial Mediterranean fever (FMF).
=== Gynecological causes ===	Source: Pelvic inflammatory disease (PID) and abscess. Ectopic pregnancy. Hemorrhagic ovarian cyst. Adnexal or ovarian torsion.

=== By system ===
A more extensive list includes the following:

- Gastrointestinal
  - GI tract
    - Inflammatory: gastroenteritis, appendicitis, gastritis, esophagitis, diverticulitis, Crohn's disease, ulcerative colitis, microscopic colitis
    - Obstruction: hernia, intussusception, volvulus, post-surgical adhesions, tumors, severe constipation, hemorrhoids
    - Vascular: embolism, thrombosis, hemorrhage, sickle cell disease, abdominal angina, blood vessel compression (such as celiac artery compression syndrome), superior mesenteric artery syndrome, postural orthostatic tachycardia syndrome
    - Digestive: peptic ulcer, lactose intolerance, celiac disease, food allergies, indigestion
  - Glands
    - Bile system
      - Inflammatory: cholecystitis, cholangitis
      - Obstruction: cholelithiasis
    - Liver
      - Inflammatory: hepatitis, liver abscess
    - Pancreatic
      - Inflammatory: pancreatitis
- Renal and urological
  - Inflammation: pyelonephritis, bladder infection
  - Obstruction: kidney stones, urolithiasis, urinary retention
  - Vascular: left renal vein entrapment
- Gynaecological or obstetric
  - Inflammatory: pelvic inflammatory disease
  - Mechanical: ovarian torsion
  - Endocrinological: menstruation, Mittelschmerz
  - Tumors: endometriosis, fibroids, ovarian cyst, ovarian cancer
  - Pregnancy: ruptured ectopic pregnancy, threatened abortion
- Abdominal wall
  - muscle strain or trauma
  - muscular infection
  - neurogenic pain: herpes zoster, radiculitis in Lyme disease, abdominal cutaneous nerve entrapment syndrome (ACNES), tabes dorsalis
- Referred pain
  - from the thorax: pneumonia, pulmonary embolism, ischemic heart disease, pericarditis
  - from the spine: radiculitis
  - from the genitals: testicular torsion
- Metabolic disturbance
  - uremia, diabetic ketoacidosis, porphyria, C1-esterase inhibitor deficiency, adrenal insufficiency, lead poisoning, black widow spider bite, narcotic withdrawal
- Blood vessels
  - aortic dissection, abdominal aortic aneurysm
- Immune system
  - sarcoidosis
  - vasculitis
  - familial Mediterranean fever
- Idiopathic
  - irritable bowel syndrome (IBS) (affecting up to 20% of the population, IBS is the most common cause of recurrent and intermittent abdominal pain)

=== By location ===
The location of abdominal pain can provide information about what may be causing the pain. The abdomen can be divided into four regions called quadrants. Locations and associated conditions include:

- Diffuse
  - Peritonitis
  - Vascular: mesenteric ischemia, ischemic colitis, Henoch-Schonlein purpura, sickle cell disease, systemic lupus erythematosus, polyarteritis nodosa
  - Small bowel obstruction
  - Irritable bowel syndrome
  - Metabolic disorders: ketoacidosis, porphyria, familial Mediterranean fever, adrenal crisis
- Epigastric
  - Heart: myocardial infarction, pericarditis
  - Stomach: gastritis, stomach ulcer, stomach cancer
  - Pancreas: pancreatitis, pancreatic cancer
  - Intestinal: duodenal ulcer, diverticulitis, appendicitis
- Right upper quadrant
  - Liver: hepatomegaly, fatty liver, hepatitis, liver cancer, abscess
  - Gallbladder and biliary tract: inflammation, gallstones, worm infection, cholangitis
  - Colon: bowel obstruction, functional disorders, gas accumulation, spasm, inflammation, colon cancer
  - Other: pneumonia, Fitz-Hugh-Curtis syndrome
- Left upper quadrant
  - Splenomegaly
  - Colon: bowel obstruction, functional disorders, gas accumulation, spasm, inflammation, colon cancer
- Peri-umbilical (the area around the umbilicus, i.e., the belly button)
  - Appendicitis
  - Pancreatitis
  - Inferior myocardial infarction
  - Peptic ulcer
  - Diabetic ketoacidosis
  - Vascular: aortic dissection, aortic rupture
  - Bowel: mesenteric ischemia, Celiac disease, inflammation, intestinal spasm, functional disorders, small bowel obstruction
- Lower abdominal pain
  - Diarrhea
  - Colitis
  - Crohn's
  - Dysentery
  - Hernia
- Right lower quadrant
  - Colon: intussusception, bowel obstruction, appendicitis (McBurney's point)
  - Renal: kidney stone (nephrolithiasis), pyelonephritis
  - Pelvic: cystitis, bladder stone, bladder cancer, pelvic inflammatory disease, pelvic pain syndrome
  - Gynecologic: endometriosis, intrauterine pregnancy, ectopic pregnancy, ovarian cyst, ovarian torsion, fibroid (leiomyoma), abscess, ovarian cancer, endometrial cancer
- Left lower quadrant
  - Bowel: diverticulitis, sigmoid colon volvulus, bowel obstruction, gas accumulation, Toxic megacolon
- Right low back pain
  - Liver: hepatomegaly
  - Kidney: kidney stone (nephrolithiasis), complicated urinary tract infection
- Left low back pain
  - Spleen
  - Kidney: kidney stone (nephrolithiasis), complicated urinary tract infection
- Low back pain
  - Kidney pain (kidney stone, kidney cancer, hydronephrosis)
  - Ureteral stone pain

== Mechanism ==
Region	Blood supply	Innervation	Structures
Foregut	Celiac artery	T5 - T9	Pharynx Esophagus Lower respiratory tract Stomach Proximal duodenum Liver Biliary tract Gallbladder Pancreas
Midgut	Superior mesenteric artery	T10 – T12	Distal duodenum Cecum Appendix Ascending colon Proximal transverse colon
Hindgut	Inferior mesenteric artery	L1 – L3	Distal transverse colon Descending colon Sigmoid colon Rectum Superior anal canal

Abdominal pain can be referred to as visceral pain or peritoneal pain. The contents of the abdomen can be divided into the foregut, midgut, and hindgut. The foregut contains the pharynx, lower respiratory tract, portions of the esophagus, stomach, portions of the duodenum (proximal), liver, biliary tract (including the gallbladder and bile ducts), and the pancreas. The midgut contains portions of the duodenum (distal), cecum, appendix, ascending colon, and first half of the transverse colon. The hindgut contains the distal half of the transverse colon, descending colon, sigmoid colon, rectum, and superior anal canal.

Each subsection of the gut has an associated visceral afferent nerve that transmits sensory information from the viscera to the spinal cord. The visceral sensory information from the gut traveling to the spinal cord, termed the visceral afferent, is non-specific and overlaps with the somatic afferent nerves, which are very specific. Therefore, visceral afferent information traveling to the spinal cord can present in the distribution of the somatic afferent nerve; this is why appendicitis initially presents with T10 periumbilical pain when it first begins and becomes T12 pain as the abdominal wall peritoneum (which is rich with somatic afferent nerves) is involved.

== Diagnosis ==
A thorough patient history and physical examination is used to better understand the underlying cause of abdominal pain.

The process of gathering a history may include:

- Obtaining more information about the chief complaint including the history of present illness; i.e. a narrative of the current symptoms such as the onset, location, duration, character, aggravating or relieving factors, and temporal nature of the pain. Identifying other possible factors may aid in the diagnosis of the underlying cause of abdominal pain, such as recent travel, recent contact with other ill individuals, and for females, a thorough gynecologic history.
- Learning about the patient's past medical history, focusing on any prior issues or surgical procedures.
- Clarifying the patient's current medication regimen, including prescriptions, over-the-counter medications, and supplements.
- Confirming the patient's drug and food allergies.
- Discussing with the patient any family history of disease processes, focusing on conditions that might resemble the patient's current presentation.
- Discussing with the patient any health-related behaviors (e.g. tobacco use, alcohol consumption, drug use, and sexual activity) that might make certain diagnoses more likely.
- Reviewing the presence of non-abdominal symptoms (e.g., fever, chills, chest pain, shortness of breath, vaginal bleeding) that can further clarify the diagnostic picture.
- Using Carnett's sign to differentiate between visceral pain and pain originating in the muscles of the abdominal wall.

After gathering a thorough history, one should perform a physical exam in order to identify important physical signs that might clarify the diagnosis, including a cardiovascular exam, lung exam, thorough abdominal exam, and for females, a genitourinary exam.

Additional investigations that can aid diagnosis include:

- Blood tests including complete blood count, basic metabolic panel, electrolytes, liver function tests, amylase, lipase, troponin I, and for females, a serum pregnancy test.
- Urinalysis
- Imaging including chest and abdominal X-rays
- Electrocardiogram

If diagnosis remains unclear after history, examination, and basic investigations as above, then more advanced investigations may reveal a diagnosis. Such tests include:

- Computed tomography of the abdomen/pelvis
- Abdominal or pelvic ultrasound
- Endoscopy or colonoscopy

== Management ==
The management of abdominal pain depends on many factors, including the etiology of the pain. Some behavioural changes implemented to prevent pain include: resting after a meal, chewing food completely and slowly, and avoiding stressful and high excitement situations after a meal. Such at home strategies may reduce the need to seek professional assistance via prevention of future abdominal pain. In the emergency department, a person presenting with abdominal pain may initially require IV fluids due to decreased intake secondary to abdominal pain and possible emesis or vomiting. Treatment for abdominal pain includes analgesia, such as non-opioid (ketorolac) and opioid medications (morphine, fentanyl). Choice of analgesia is dependent on the cause of the pain, as ketorolac can worsen some intra-abdominal processes. Patients presenting to the emergency department with abdominal pain may receive a "GI cocktail" that includes an antacid (examples include omeprazole, famotidine, magnesium hydroxide, and calcium carbonate) and lidocaine. After addressing pain, there may be a role for antimicrobial treatment in some cases of abdominal pain. Butylscopolamine (Buscopan) is used to treat cramping abdominal pain with some success.

=== Emergencies ===
Below is a brief overview of abdominal pain emergencies.

Condition	Presentation	Diagnosis	Management
Appendicitis	Abdominal pain, nausea, vomiting, fever Periumbilical pain, migrates to RLQ	Clinical (history and physical exam) Abdominal CT	Patient made NPO (nothing by mouth) IV fluids as needed General surgery consultation, possible appendectomy Antibiotics Pain control
Cholecystitis	Abdominal pain (RUQ, radiates epigastric), nausea, vomiting, fever, Murphy's sign	Clinical (history and physical exam) Imaging (RUQ ultrasound) Labs (leukocytosis, transamintis, hyperbilirubinemia)	Patient made NPO (nothing by mouth) IV fluids as needed General surgery consultation, possible cholecystectomy Antibiotics Pain, nausea control
Acute pancreatitis	Abdominal pain (sharp epigastric, shooting to back), nausea, vomiting	Clinical (history and physical exam) Labs (elevated lipase) Imaging (abdominal CT, ultrasound)	Patient made NPO (nothing by mouth) IV fluids as needed Pain, nausea control Possibly consultation of general surgery or interventional radiology
Bowel obstruction	Abdominal pain (diffuse, crampy), bilious emesis, constipation	Clinical (history and physical exam) Imaging (abdominal X-ray, abdominal CT)	Patient made NPO (nothing by mouth) IV fluids as needed Nasogastric tube placement General surgery consultation Pain control
Upper GI bleed	Abdominal pain (epigastric), hematochezia, melena, hematemesis, hypovolemia	Clinical (history & physical exam, including digital rectal exam) Labs (complete blood count, coagulation profile, transaminases, stool guaiac)	Aggressive IV fluid resuscitation Blood transfusion as needed Medications: proton pump inhibitor, octreotide Stable patient: observation Unstable patient: consultation (general surgery, gastroenterology, interventional radiology)
Lower GI bleed	Abdominal pain, hematochezia, melena, hypovolemia	Clinical (history and physical exam, including digital rectal exam) Labs (complete blood count, coagulation profile, transaminases, stool guaiac)	Aggressive IV fluid resuscitation Blood transfusion as needed Medications: proton pump inhibitor Stable patient: observation Unstable patient: consultation (general surgery, gastroenterology, interventional radiology)
Perforated Viscous	Abdominal pain (sudden onset of localized pain), abdominal distension, rigid abdomen	Clinical (history and physical exam) Imaging (abdominal X-ray or CT showing free air) Labs (complete blood count)	Aggressive IV fluid resuscitation General surgery consultation Antibiotics
Volvulus	Sigmoid colon volvulus: Abdominal pain (>2 days, distention, constipation) Cecal volvulus: Abdominal pain (acute onset), nausea, vomiting	Clinical (history and physical exam) Imaging (abdominal X-ray or CT)	Sigmoid: Gastroenterology consultation (flexibile sigmoidoscopy) Cecal: General surgery consultation (right hemicolectomy)
Ectopic pregnancy	Abdominal and pelvic pain, bleeding If ruptured ectopic pregnancy, the patient may present with peritoneal irritation and hypovolemic shock	Clinical (history and physical exam) Labs: complete blood count, urine pregnancy test followed with quantitative blood beta-hCG Imaging: transvaginal ultrasound	If patient is unstable: IV fluid resuscitation, urgent obstetrics and gynecology consultation If patient is stable: continue diagnostic workup, establish OBGYN follow-up
Abdominal aortic aneurysm	Abdominal pain, flank pain, back pain, hypotension, pulsatile abdominal mass	Clinical (history and physical exam) Imaging: Ultrasound, CT angiography, MRA/magnetic resonance angiography	If patient is unstable: IV fluid resuscitation, urgent surgical consultation If patient is stable: admit for observation
Aortic dissection	Abdominal pain (sudden onset of epigastric or back pain), hypertension, new aortic murmur	Clinical (history and physical exam) Imaging: Chest X-ray (showing widened mediastinum), CT angiography, MRA, transthoracic echocardiogram/TTE, transesophageal echocardiogram/TEE	IV fluid resuscitation Blood transfusion as needed (obtain type and cross) Medications: reduce blood pressure (sodium nitroprusside plus beta blocker or calcium channel blocker) Surgery consultation
Liver injury	After trauma (blunt or penetrating), abdominal pain (RUQ), right rib pain, right flank pain, right shoulder pain	Clinical (history and physical exam) Imaging: FAST examination, CT of abdomen and pelvis Diagnostic peritoneal aspiration and lavage	Resuscitation (advanced trauma life support) with IV fluids (crystalloid) and blood transfusion If patient is unstable: general or trauma surgery consultation with subsequent exploratory laparotomy
Splenic injury	After trauma (blunt or penetrating), abdominal pain (LUQ), left rib pain, left flank pain	Clinical (history and physical exam) Imaging: FAST examination, CT of abdomen and pelvis Diagnostic peritoneal aspiration and lavage	Resuscitation (advanced trauma life support) with IV fluids (crystalloid) and blood transfusion If patient is unstable: general or trauma surgery consultation with subsequent exploratory laparotomy and possible splenectomy If patient is stable: medical management, consultation of interventional radiology for possible arterial embolization

== Prognosis ==
One well-known aspect of primary health care is its low prevalence of potentially dangerous abdominal pain causes. Patients with abdominal pain are less likely to be diagnosed with a specific health condition than patients with other symptoms (such as dyspnea or chest pain). Most people who suffer from stomach pain have a benign issue, like dyspepsia. In general, it is discovered that 20% to 25% of patients with abdominal pain have a serious condition that necessitates admission to an acute care hospital.

== Epidemiology ==
Abdominal pain is the reason about 3% of adults see their family physician. Rates of emergency department (ED) visits in the United States for abdominal pain increased 18% from 2006 through to 2011. This was the largest increase out of 20 common conditions seen in the ED. The rate of ED use for nausea and vomiting also increased 18%.

== Special populations ==
=== Geriatrics ===
More time and resources are used on older patients with abdominal pain than on any other patient presentation in the emergency department (ED). Compared to younger patients with the same complaint, their length of stay is 20% longer, they need to be admitted almost half the time, and they need surgery 1/3 of the time.

Age does not reduce the total number of T cells, but it does reduce their functionality. The elderly person's ability to fight infection is weakened as a result. Additionally, they have changed the strength and integrity of their skin and mucous membranes, which are physical barriers to infection. It is well known that older patients experience altered pain perception.

The challenge of obtaining a sufficient history from an elderly patient can be attributed to multiple factors. Reduced memory or hearing could make the issue worse. It is common to encounter stoicism combined with a fear of losing one's independence if a serious condition is discovered. Changes in mental status, whether acute or chronic, are common.

=== Pregnancy ===
Unique clinical challenges arise when pregnant women experience abdominal pain. First off, there are many possible causes of abdominal pain during pregnancy. These include intraabdominal diseases that arise incidentally during pregnancy as well as obstetric or gynecologic disorders associated with pregnancy. Secondly, pregnancy modifies the natural history and clinical manifestation of numerous abdominal disorders. Third, pregnancy modifies and limits the diagnostic assessment. For instance, concerns about fetal safety during pregnancy are raised by invasive exams and radiologic testing. Fourth, while receiving therapy during pregnancy, the mother's and the fetus' interests need to be taken into account.

== See also ==
- Abdominal distension
- Abdominal mass
