= Digestive system surgery =

Surgery

- ICD-10-PCS: 0D
- ICD-9-CM: 42-54
- MeSH: D013505
- OPS-301 code: 5-42...5-54

Digestive system surgery, or gastrointestinal surgery, can be divided into upper GI surgery and lower GI surgery.

== Subtypes ==
=== Upper gastrointestinal ===
Upper gastrointestinal surgery, often referred to as upper GI surgery, refers to a practise of surgery that focuses on the upper parts of the gastrointestinal tract. There are many operations relevant to the upper gastrointestinal tract that are best done only by those who keep constant practise, owing to their complexity. Consequently, a general surgeon may specialise in 'upper GI' by attempting to maintain currency in those skills.

Upper GI surgeons would have an interest in, and may exclusively perform, the following operations:

- Pancreaticoduodenectomy
- Esophagectomy
- Liver resection

=== Lower gastrointestinal ===
Lower gastrointestinal surgery includes colorectal surgery as well as surgery of the small intestine.

Academically, it refers to a sub-specialisation of medical practise whereby a general surgeon focuses on the lower gastrointestinal tract.

In the U.S., a student wanting to specialize and practice in adult lower GI surgery would generally have to go through four years of undergraduate college pre-medical education and get a bachelor's degree, then finish the four years of medical school, then finish a typically five-year-long residency in general surgery, and then perform a subsequent one-year-long (minimum) residency in surgery of the small intestine or large intestine (the colon- specifically, the cecum, the vermiform appendix, the ascending colon, the transverse colon, the hepatic flexure and the splenic flexure, the descending colon, and the sigmoid colon; and also the rectum and the anus).

A fellowship (in surgery of the small intestine or of the large bowel, or in pediatric/neonatal lower GI surgery, or in surgery of congenital abnormalities or rare disorders of the lower GI tract, or in emergency/trauma surgery or in cancer surgery of the area), would add on approximately one to three more years.

A lower GI surgeon might specialise in the following operations:

- Colectomy
- Low (anterior) (LAR) or ultra-low (anterior) resections (ULAR) for rectal cancer, etc.
- Pelvic exenteration for advanced or recurrent cancer; usually performed in conjunction with other surgeons (e.g., urologists, obstetricians and gynecologists)
