= Colic artery =

Colic artery (an artery that serves the colon) may refer to the:

- Ileocolic artery
- Right colic artery
- Middle colic artery
- Left colic artery

The first three are branches of the superior mesenteric artery; the fourth is a branch of the inferior mesenteric artery.
