= Colic vein =

Colic vein may refer to:

- Left colic vein
- Middle colic vein
- Right colic vein
