= Colectomy =

Operation to remove all or part of the colon

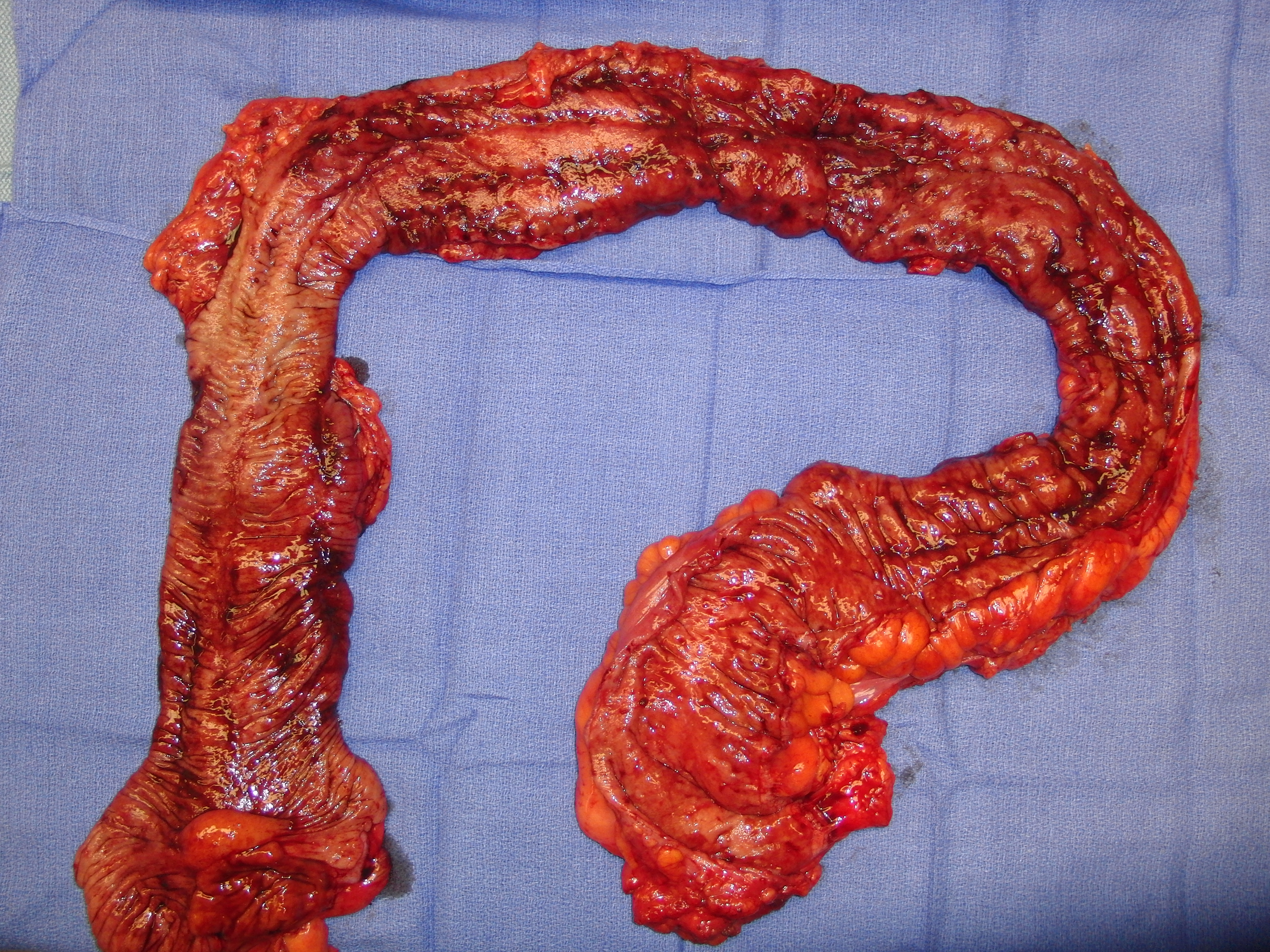
- Resected colon specimen from a human male with ulcerative colitis
- Specialty: General surgery, colorectal surgery
- ICD-9-CM: 45.8, 45.73
- MeSH: D003082

Colectomy (col- + -ectomy) is the surgical removal of any extent of the colon, the longest portion of the large bowel. Partial or subtotal colectomy refers to removing a portion of the colon, while total colectomy involves removal of the entire colon. Proctocolectomy extends the total colectomy to include removal of the rectum.

Colectomy may be performed for prophylactic, curative, or palliative reasons. Indications include inflammatory/autoimmune, cancer/precancer, vascular/ischemic, mechanical, infectious, traumatic, and functional. Most colectomies are elective; however conditions such as perforation, necrosis (transmural or otherwise), uncontrolled hemorrhage, or obstruction with imminent perforation require emergency surgery. Colectomy is performed either as an open surgery requiring a large incision or minimally invasive which includes standard laparoscopic and robot-assisted laparoscopic.

Following removal of the bowel segment(s), either continuity of the bowel is restored with an anastomosis or an intestinal diversion is created through an ostomy. When parts of the colon remain, typically a colostomy is created whereas a total colectomy requires an ileostomy. Complications of the surgery include anastomotic leak, bleeding, infection, ileus, and damage to surrounding structures such as the ureter, bladder, or adjacent vasculature.

== Indications ==
Common indications for colectomy include:

- Colorectal cancer or colon polyps not removable by colonoscopic polypectomy
- Inflammatory bowel disease such as ulcerative colitis or Crohn's disease
- Diverticulitis and diverticular disease
- Bowel ischemia or ischemic colitis
- Perforation or injury from trauma or other causes
- Uncontrolled bleeding
- Volvulus
- Stricture
- Slow-transit constipation
- Hirschsprung's disease

Prophylactic colectomy may be indicated in patients with hereditary cancer syndromes such as familial adenomatous polyposis or Lynch syndrome, and in certain cases of inflammatory bowel disease due to an increased risk of colorectal cancer

== Procedure ==
=== Pre-operative preparation ===
Before surgery, patients typically undergo preoperative bloodwork, including a complete blood count and type and screen of blood type. Diagnostic imaging may include colonoscopy or CT scans of the abdomen and pelvis. In cancer patients, lesions are commonly tattooed via colonoscopy before colectomy to give the surgeon an intraoperative visual guide. For non-emergent procedures, patients are typically instructed to follow a clear liquid diet or fast and take a mechanical bowel preparation (oral osmotic agents or laxative) to clear the bowels before surgery. Antibiotics may also be prescribed ahead of surgery to reduce risk of post-operative infection.

=== Operation ===
Traditionally, colectomy is performed via an abdominal incision, a technique known as laparotomy. Minimally invasive colectomy using laparoscopy is a well-established procedure in many medical centers. Robot-assisted colectomy is growing in scope of indications and popularity.

==== Laparoscopic approach ====
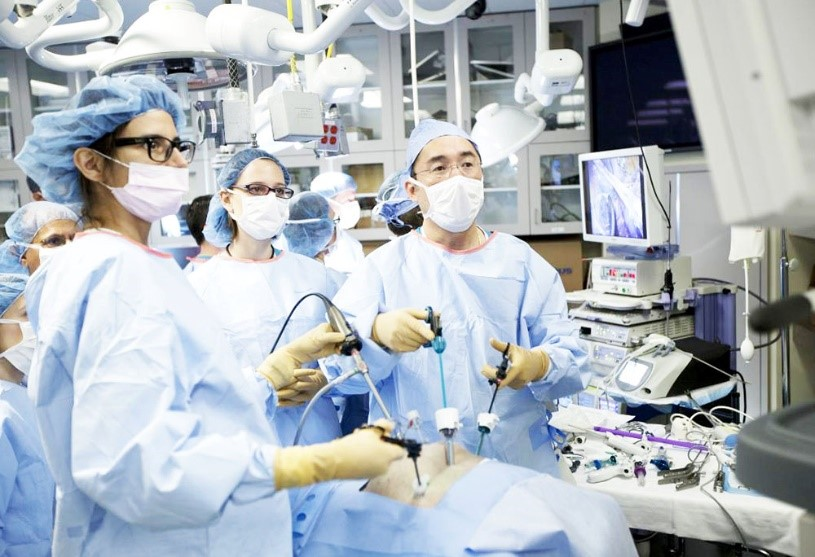
Surgeons performing laparoscopic surgery

As of 2012, more than 40% of colon resections in the United States are performed via a laparoscopic approach. For laparoscopic colectomy, the typical operative technique involves 4-5 separate incisions made in the abdomen. Trochars are introduced to gain access to the peritoneal cavity and serve as ports for the laparoscopic camera and other instruments. Studies have proven the feasibility of single port access colectomy, which would require only one small incision, but no clear benefit in terms of outcome or complication rate has been demonstrated.

==== Resection ====
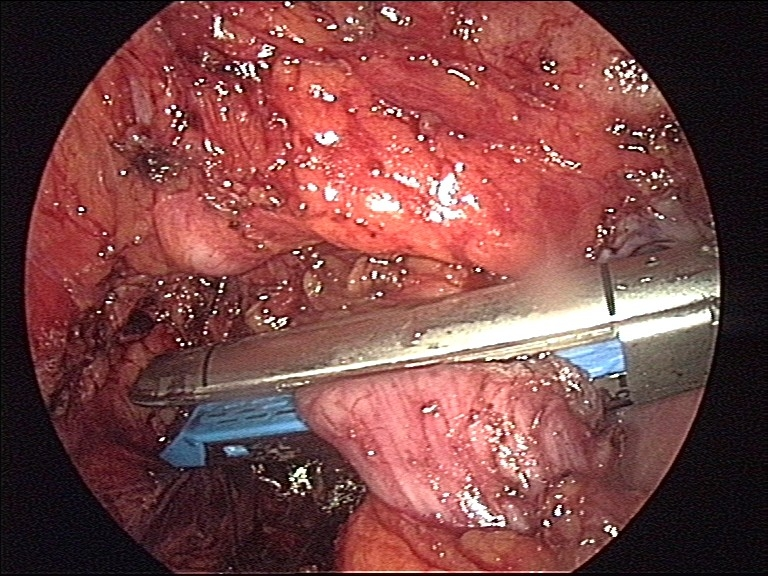
Laparoscopic stapler resection of sigmoid colon

Before removal, the portion of the bowel to be resected must be freed or mobilized. This is done by dissection and removal of the mesentery and other peritoneal attachments. Resection of any part of the colon entails mobilization and the cutting and sealing, or ligation, of the blood vessels supplying the portion of the colon to be removed. A stapler is typically used to cut across the colon to prevent spillage of intestinal contents into the peritoneal cavity. Colectomy as treatment for colorectal cancer also includes lymphadenectomy, or removal of surrounding lymph nodes, which may be done for staging of the cancer or removal of cancerous nodes. More extensive lymphadenectomy is sometimes accomplished by the removal of the mesocolon, the fatty tissue adjacent to the colon, which contains blood supply, lymphatics, and nerves to the colon.

==== Primary anastomosis vs colostomy ====
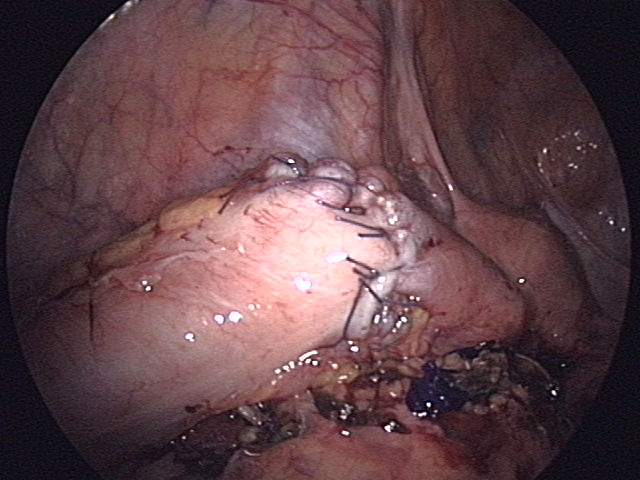
Suture anastomosis of sigmoid colon

When the resection is complete, the surgeon has the option of reconnecting the bowel by stitching or stapling together the cut ends of the bowel (primary anastomosis) or performing a colostomy to create a stoma, an opening of the bowel to the abdominal wall that provides an alternate exit for the contents of the gastrointestinal tract. When colectomy is performed as part of damage control surgery in life-threatening trauma resulting in destructive colon injury, the surgeon may opt to leave the cut ends of the bowel sealed and disconnected for a short time to allow for further resuscitation of the patient before returning to the operating room for definitive repair (anastomosis or colostomy).

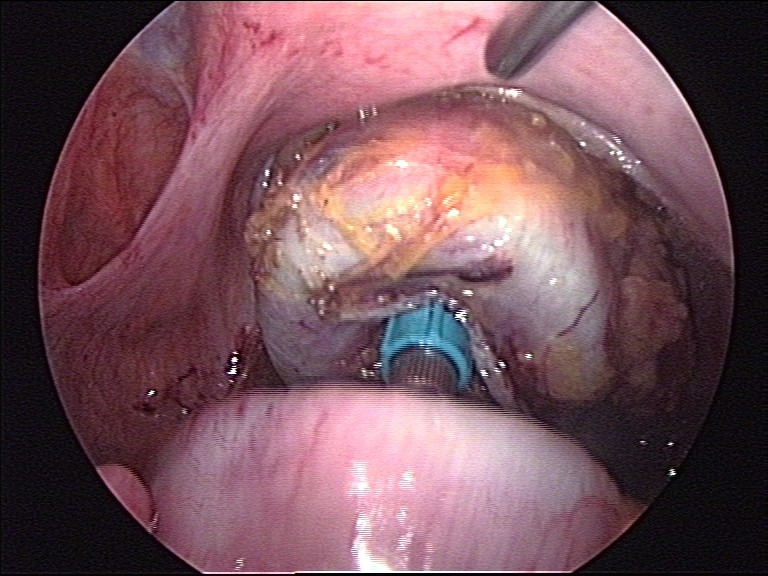
Stapler anastomosis of sigmoid colon

In modern times, surgical staplers are typically used to create colorectal anastomoses, although hand sewn, or sutured, anastomoses are still done today. Studies have shown that differences in rates of anastomotic leak and surgical site contamination for stapled vs. sutured anastomoses are not statistically significant. The increased speed and decreased human variability afforded by stapling make it an attractive option for most surgeons.

Several factors are taken into account when deciding between anastomosis or colostomy, including:

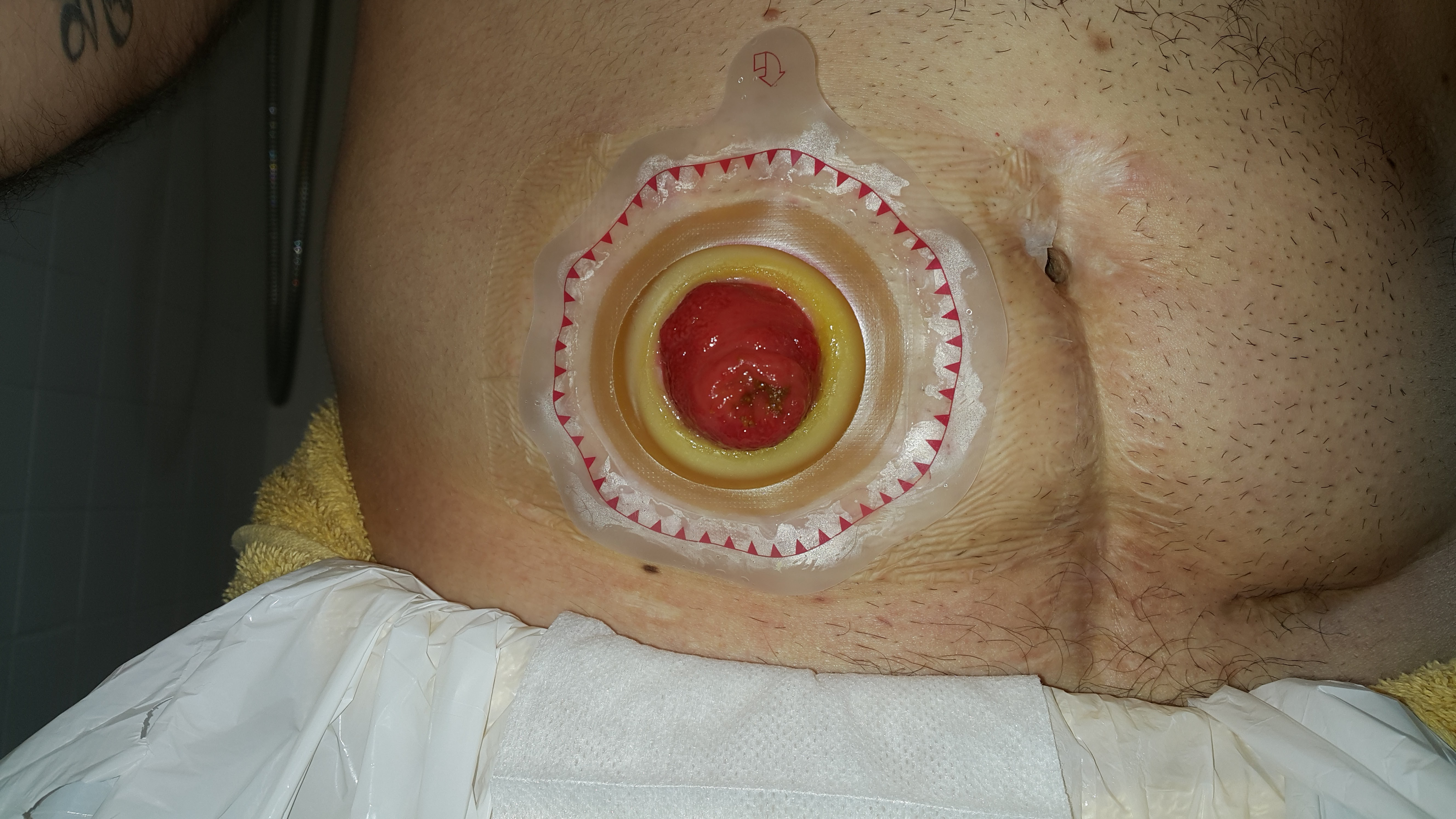
Ileostomy patient with ostomy wafer

- Urgency of presentation;
- Contamination of the operative field;
- Technical difficulty of the anastomosis;
- Disease severity and stage;
- Physiologic considerations: pelvic floor function, length of bowel remaining;
- Patient factors: social support, socioeconomic status, level of education and health literacy, availability of specialist services, and level of functioning.

Giving a patient a colostomy avoids the risk of a failed anastomosis. Still, it places a societal, psychological, and physical burden on the patient, as a stoma requires special care and consideration.

== Complications and risks ==
All surgery involves a risk of serious complications, including bleeding, infection, damage to surrounding structures, and death. Additional complications associated with colectomy include:

- Damage to adjacent structures such as ureter, bowel, spleen, etc.;
- Need for further operations;
- Conversion of primary anastomosis to colostomy;
- Anastomotic dehiscence or leak;
- Inability to resect colon as intended;
- Cardiopulmonary or other organ failure;
- Death.

The overall risk depends significantly on the person's overall health. This type of surgery usually has high survival rates, but (for example) an emergency colonic resection performed on a frail elderly person with other health problems can have a significant chance of dying.

=== Anastomotic dehiscence and anastomotic leak ===
An anastomosis carries the risk of dehiscence or breakdown of the surgical connection. Contamination of the peritoneal cavity with fecal matter as a result of the anastomotic leak can lead to peritonitis, sepsis or death. In patients who underwent colectomy as a treatment for colorectal cancer, an anastomotic leak increases the risk of recurrence of cancer in the same area and reduces survival in the long term. Several factors influence the risk of anastomotic dehiscence, including preservation of blood supply to the cut ends of the bowel, tension on the anastomosis, and the patient's intestinal microbiome, which affects wound healing and potential for surgical site infection.

The use of NSAIDS for analgesia following gastrointestinal surgery remains controversial, given mixed evidence of an increased risk of leakage from any bowel anastomosis created. This risk may vary according to the class of NSAID prescribed.

== Procedural Types ==
There are several types of subtotal colectomy refers to the section or sections of colon resected. Right hemicolectomy and left hemicolectomy refer to the resection of the ascending colon (right) and the descending colon (left), respectively. When middle colic vessels and transverse colon are also resected, it may be referred to as an extended hemicolectomy. Left hemicolectomy is most commonly indicated for cancer in the splenic flexure or descending colon, diverticular disease of the descending colon, and colovesicular or colovaginal fistulas that develop as a consequence of diverticular disease. The main limitation to performing a left extended colectomy is the difficulty of achieving a colorectal anastomosis afterward. Different techniques, such as Deloyer's or Rosi-Cahil's techniques, have been proposed to solve this issue. Right hemicolectomy is most commonly indicated for masses in the right, or ascending, colon but may also be performed for neoplasms of the cecum or appendix. Right-sided diverticulitis, cecal volvulus, inflammatory bowel disease, and adenomatous polyps are benign conditions that may require right hemicolectomy.

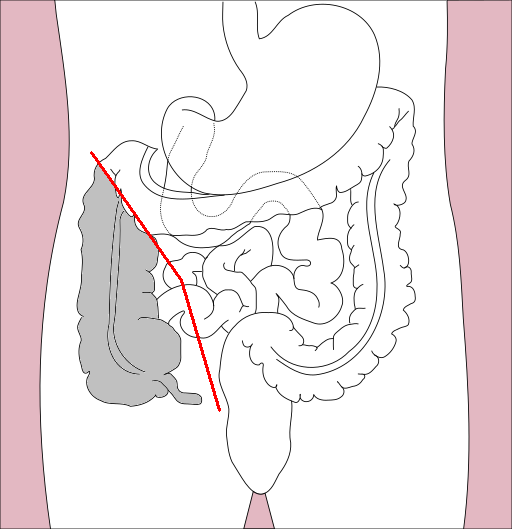
Right hemicolectomy

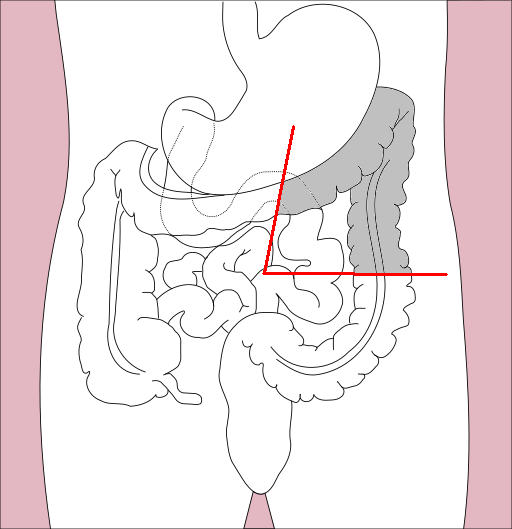
Left hemicolectomy

Transverse colectomy involves resection of the transverse colon, the segment of the colon between the hepatic flexure and the splenic flexure. Transverse colectomy is uncommon, as malignant pathologies of the transverse colon typically call for removal of the left colon or right colon as well as the transverse colon due to the variable contributions of the ileocolic, right colic, and left colic blood vessels to lymphatic drainage of the transverse colon. Transverse colectomy is sometimes appropriate for focal benign pathologies such as local inflammation and local trauma or injury such as perforation.

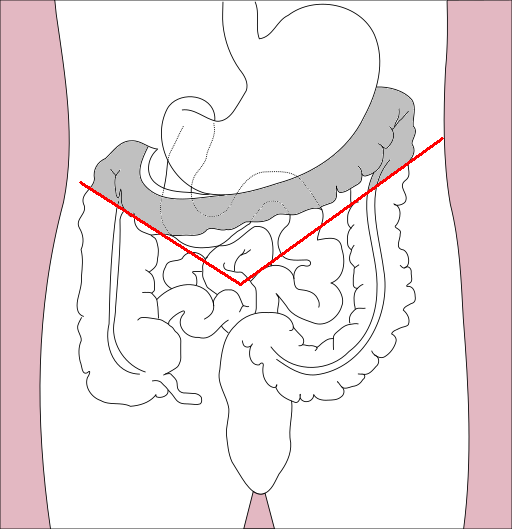
Transverse colectomy

Sigmoidectomy is a resection of the last part of the colon, known as the sigmoid colon, and can include part or all of the rectum. When it includes removing the entire rectum, it's called a (proctosigmoidectomy) or Hartmann's procedure

A total colectomy is the removal of the entire colon from the terminal ileum to the top of the rectum. A protocolectomy removes most or all of the rectum in addition to the colon. Depending on the condition of all or some remaining rectum, there are various methods for managing output, from surgical anastamosis to creating an ostomy.

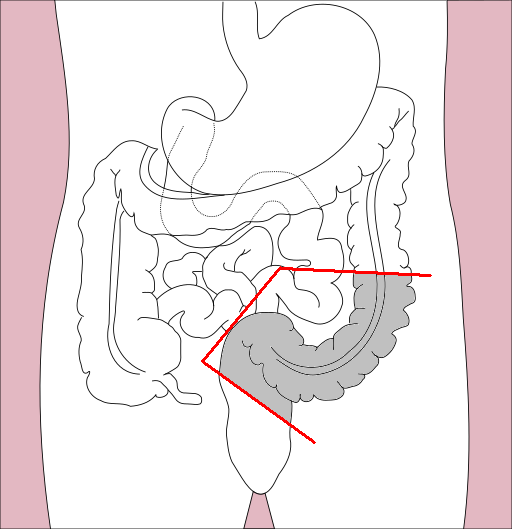
Sigmoidectomy

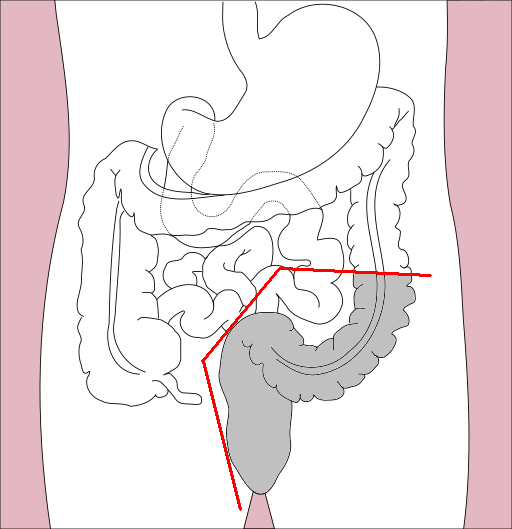
Proctosimoidectomy

If the rectum is also removed, it is a total proctocolectomy.

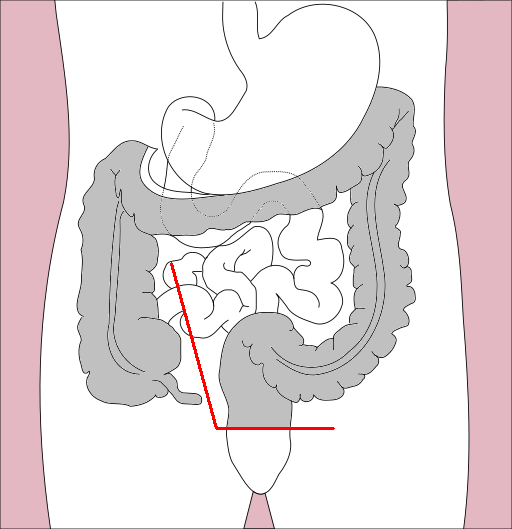
Total colectomy

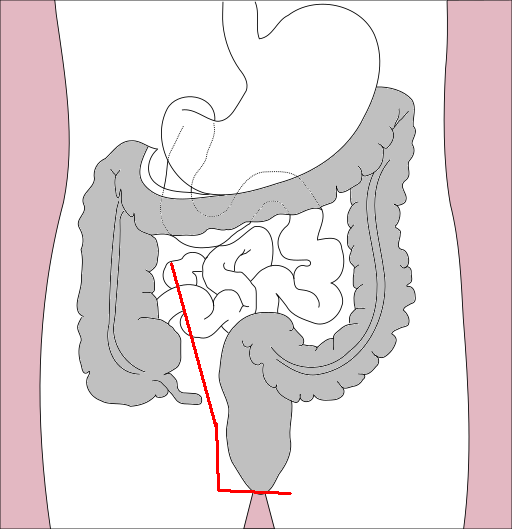
Total proctocolectomy

Subtotal colectomy is resection of part of the colon or a resection of all of the colon without complete resection.

== History ==
The first concepts of colon surgery were thought to have originated in the 15th century as a means to relieve obstructed bowel. The first reported ostomy, performed in 1776 by Pillore of Rouen as an attempt to circumvent blockage caused by a rectal tumor, was done at the insistence of the patient despite opposition from other doctors. While this initial attempt resulted in the death of the patient after only 20 days, subsequent attempts in the following years were more successful. By the mid-1880s, hundreds of colectomies had been performed, with a fatality rate between 50 and 60% (lower for those performed in cases of cancer). Dr. Robert Weir suggested in his 1886 case report on the resection of a rectal tumor that shock from the operation and leakage of intestinal contents both during and after surgery contributed to these numbers. The introduction of exteriorization, where the intestinal segment of interest was brought out of the abdomen and resected after the abdomen was closed around it, decreased the morbidity of the procedure.

=== Colonic anastomosis ===
Jean Francois Reybard performed the first successful end-to-end colonic anastomosis following sigmoid colon resection in 1823. Primarily criticized as dangerous, Reybard's procedure went against the standard protocol of the day: resection of the colon with stoma creation and distal closure. However, colonic anastomosis became more acceptable by the end of the 19th century.

Many different methods and materials were used to join ends of the bowel in the early days of intestinal anastomosis, including animal tracheas, artificial pipes made of reed, wood or other materials, cardboard, and rings of silver or wax. Absorbable vegetable plates or sutures became the preference of most by the 1990s. With the advent of the surgical stapler, most surgeons have moved on from hand sewing colorectal anastomoses. However, the dexterity and precision afforded by current robotic surgical technology have spurred new interest in the role of sutured anastomosis.

=== Minimally invasive colectomy ===
A report of the first laparoscopically assisted colectomies was published by Jacobs et al. in 1991. While initial concerns were raised about the incidence of port site reoccurrence of tumors after laparoscopic colectomy for cancer, it was later found to be similar to that of wound implant of tumor cells as a result of open colectomy for cancer. By the mid-2000s, several studies had been published demonstrating that laparoscopic colectomy was at least as safe as open colectomy and could lead to shorter post-operative recovery times when performed by a skilled surgeon.

== See also ==
- List of surgeries by type
