= Large intestine =

Last part of the digestive system in vertebrates

- Front of abdomen, showing the large intestine, with the stomach and small intestine in gray.

Details
- Part of: Gastrointestinal tract
- System: Digestive system
- Artery: Superior mesenteric, inferior mesenteric and iliac arteries
- Vein: Superior and inferior mesenteric vein
- Lymph: Inferior mesenteric lymph nodes

Identifiers
- Latin: colon, intestinum crassum
- MeSH: D007420
- TA98: A05.7.01.001
- TA2: 2963
- FMA: 7201

The large intestine, also known as the large bowel, is the last part of the gastrointestinal tract and of the digestive system in tetrapods. Water and salts are absorbed here and the remaining waste material is stored in the rectum as feces before being removed by defecation. Although it is shorter than the small intestine, it is called the large intestine because it is wider in diameter.

In humans, the large intestine begins in the right iliac region of the pelvis, just at or below the waist, where it is joined to the end of the small intestine at the cecum, via the ileocecal valve. It then continues as the colon ascending the abdomen, across the width of the abdominal cavity as the transverse colon, and then descending to the rectum and its endpoint at the anal canal. Overall, in humans, the large intestine is about 1.5 metres (5 ft) long, which is about one-fifth of the whole length of the human gastrointestinal tract.

In human medicine, the terms "large intestine" and "colon" are often used interchangeably, but most sources define the large intestine as the combination of the cecum, colon, rectum, and anal canal. Some other sources exclude the anal canal.

== Structure ==
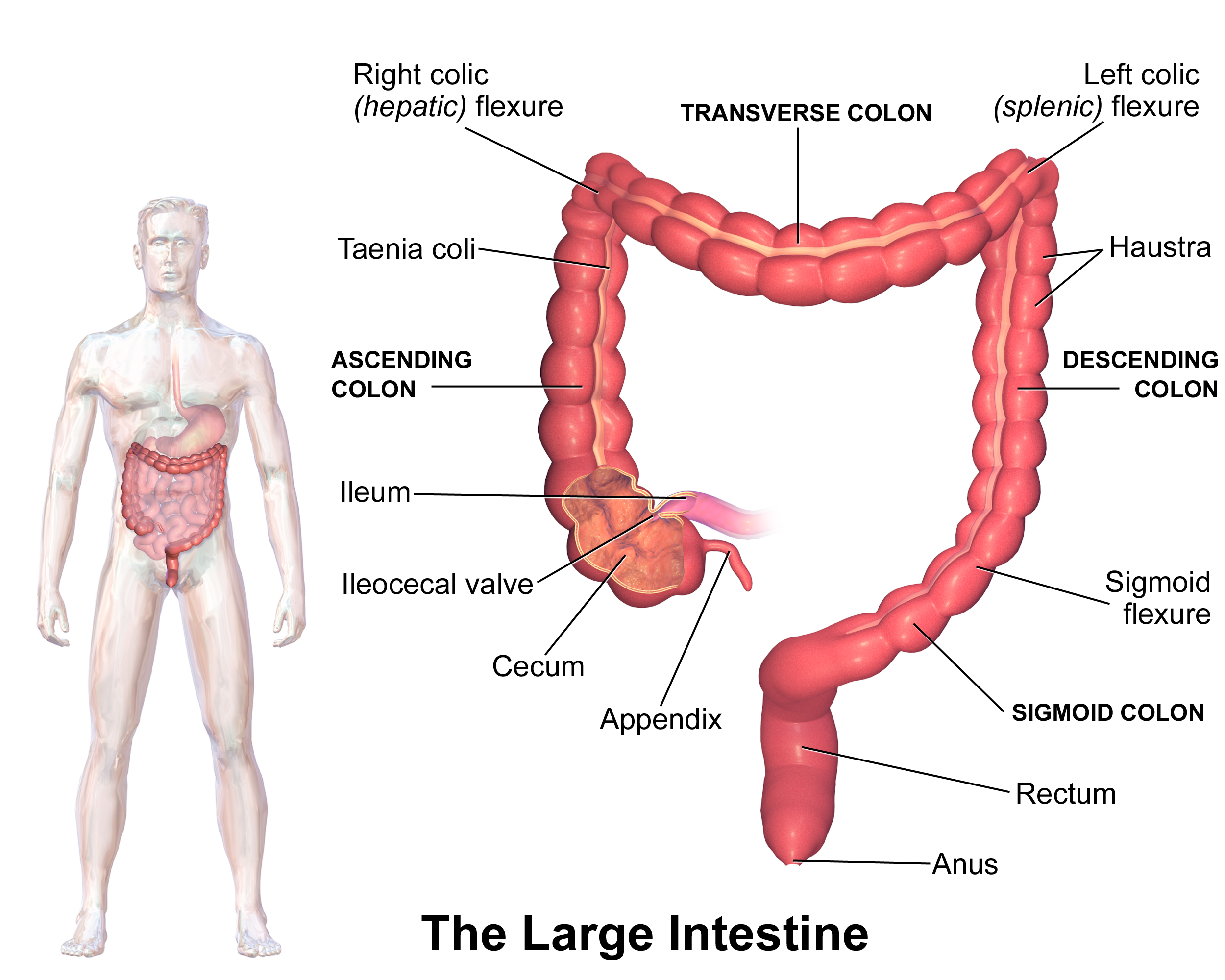
Illustration of the large intestine.

The colon of the large intestine is the last part of the digestive system. It has a segmented appearance due to a series of saccules called haustra. It extracts water and salt from solid wastes before they are eliminated from the body and is the site in which the fermentation of unabsorbed material by the gut microbiota occurs. Unlike the small intestine, the colon does not play a major role in absorption of foods and nutrients. About 1.5 litres (53 imp fl oz; 51 US fl oz) of water arrives in the colon each day.

The colon is the longest part of the large intestine and its average length in the adult human is 166 centimetres (65 in) (range of 80 to 313 cm) for males, and 155 cm (range of 80 to 214 cm) for females.

=== Sections ===
Inner diameters of colon sections

In mammals, the large intestine consists of the cecum (including the appendix), colon (the longest part), rectum, and anal canal.

The four sections of the colon are: the ascending colon, transverse colon, descending colon, and sigmoid colon. These sections turn at the colic flexures.

The parts of the colon are either intraperitoneal or behind it in the retroperitoneum. Retroperitoneal organs, in general, do not have a complete covering of peritoneum, so they are fixed in location. Intraperitoneal organs are completely surrounded by peritoneum and are therefore mobile. Of the colon, the ascending colon, descending colon and rectum are retroperitoneal, while the cecum, appendix, transverse colon and sigmoid colon are intraperitoneal. This is important as it affects which organs can be easily accessed during surgery, such as a laparotomy.

In terms of diameter, the cecum is the widest, averaging slightly less than 9 cm in healthy individuals, and the transverse colon averages less than 6 cm in diameter. The descending and sigmoid colon are slightly smaller, with the sigmoid colon averaging 4–5 cm (1.6–2.0 in) in diameter. Diameters larger than certain thresholds for each colonic section can be diagnostic for megacolon.

3D file generated from computed tomography of large intestine

==== Cecum and appendix ====
The cecum is the first section of the large intestine and is involved in digestion, while the appendix which develops embryologically from it, is not involved in digestion and is considered to be part of the gut-associated lymphoid tissue. The function of the appendix is uncertain, but some sources believe that it has a role in housing a sample of the gut microbiota, and is able to help to repopulate the colon with microbiota if depleted during the course of an immune reaction. The appendix has also been shown to have a high concentration of lymphatic cells.

==== Ascending colon ====
The ascending colon is the first of four main sections of the large intestine. It is connected to the small intestine by a section of bowel called the cecum. The ascending colon runs upwards through the abdominal cavity toward the transverse colon for approximately eight inches (20 cm).

One of the main functions of the colon is to remove the water and other key nutrients from waste material and recycle them. As the waste material exits the small intestine through the ileocecal valve, it will move into the cecum and then to the ascending colon where this process of extraction starts. The waste material is pumped upwards toward the transverse colon by peristalsis. The ascending colon is sometimes attached to the appendix via Gerlach's valve. In ruminants, the ascending colon is known as the spiral colon.

==== Transverse colon ====
The transverse colon is the part of the colon from the hepatic flexure, also known as the right colic, (the turn of the colon by the liver) to the splenic flexure also known as the left colic, (the turn of the colon by the spleen). The transverse colon hangs off the stomach, attached to it by a large fold of peritoneum called the greater omentum. On the posterior side, the transverse colon is connected to the posterior abdominal wall by a mesentery known as the transverse mesocolon.

The transverse colon is encased in peritoneum, and is therefore mobile (unlike the parts of the colon immediately before and after it).

The proximal two-thirds of the transverse colon is perfused by the middle colic artery, a branch of the superior mesenteric artery (SMA), while the latter third is supplied by branches of the inferior mesenteric artery (IMA). The "watershed" area between these two blood supplies, which represents the embryologic division between the midgut and hindgut, is an area sensitive to ischemia.

==== Descending colon ====
The descending colon is the part of the colon from the splenic flexure to the beginning of the sigmoid colon. One function of the descending colon in the digestive system is to store feces that will be emptied into the rectum. It is retroperitoneal in two-thirds of humans. In the other third, it has a (usually short) mesentery. The arterial supply comes via the left colic artery. The descending colon is also called the distal gut, as it is further along the gastrointestinal tract than the proximal gut. Gut flora are very dense in this region.

==== Sigmoid colon ====
The sigmoid colon is the part of the large intestine after the descending colon and before the rectum. The name sigmoid means S-shaped (see sigmoid; cf. sigmoid sinus). The walls of the sigmoid colon are muscular and contract to increase the pressure inside the colon, causing the stool to move into the rectum.

The sigmoid colon is supplied with blood from several branches (usually between 2 and 6) of the sigmoid arteries, a branch of the IMA. The IMA terminates as the superior rectal artery.

Sigmoidoscopy is a common diagnostic technique used to examine the sigmoid colon.

==== Rectum ====
The rectum is the last section of the large intestine. It holds the formed feces awaiting elimination via defecation. It is about 12 cm (or 4.7 in) long.

=== Appearance ===
The cecum – the first part of the large intestine

- Taeniae coli – three bands of smooth muscle
- Haustra – bulges caused by contraction of taeniae coli
- Epiploic appendages – small fat accumulations on the viscera

The taenia coli run the length of the large intestine. Because the taenia coli are shorter than the large bowel itself, the colon becomes sacculated, forming the haustra of the colon which are the shelf-like intraluminal projections.

=== Blood supply ===
Arterial supply to the colon comes from branches of the superior mesenteric artery (SMA) and inferior mesenteric artery (IMA). Flow between these two systems communicates via the marginal artery of the colon that runs parallel to the colon for its entire length. Historically, a structure variously identified as the arc of Riolan or meandering mesenteric artery (of Moskowitz) was thought to connect the proximal SMA to the proximal IMA. This variably present structure would be important if either vessel were occluded. However, at least one review of the literature questions the existence of this vessel, with some experts calling for the abolition of these terms from future medical literature.

Venous drainage usually mirrors colonic arterial supply, with the inferior mesenteric vein draining into the splenic vein, and the superior mesenteric vein joining the splenic vein to form the hepatic portal vein that then enters the liver. Middle rectal veins are an exception, delivering blood to inferior vena cava and bypassing the liver.

=== Lymphatic drainage ===
Lymphatic drainage from the ascending colon and proximal two-thirds of the transverse colon is to the ileocolic lymph nodes and the superior mesenteric lymph nodes, which drain into the cisterna chyli. The lymph from the distal one-third of the transverse colon, the descending colon, the sigmoid colon, and the upper rectum drain into the inferior mesenteric and colic lymph nodes. The lower rectum to the anal canal above the pectinate line drain to the internal ileocolic nodes. The anal canal below the pectinate line drains into the superficial inguinal nodes. The pectinate line only roughly marks this transition.

=== Nerve supply ===
Sympathetic supply: superior & inferior mesenteric ganglia; parasympathetic supply: vagus & sacral plexus (S2-S4)

=== Development ===
The endoderm, mesoderm and ectoderm are germ layers that develop in a process called gastrulation. Gastrulation occurs early in human development. The gastrointestinal tract is derived from these layers.

=== Variation ===
One variation on the normal anatomy of the colon occurs when extra loops form, resulting in a colon that is up to five metres longer than normal. This condition, referred to as redundant colon, typically has no direct major health consequences, though rarely volvulus occurs, resulting in obstruction and requiring immediate medical attention. A significant indirect health consequence is that use of a standard adult colonoscope is difficult and in some cases impossible when a redundant colon is present, though specialized variants on the instrument (including the pediatric variant) are useful in overcoming this problem.

== Microanatomy ==
=== Colonic crypts ===
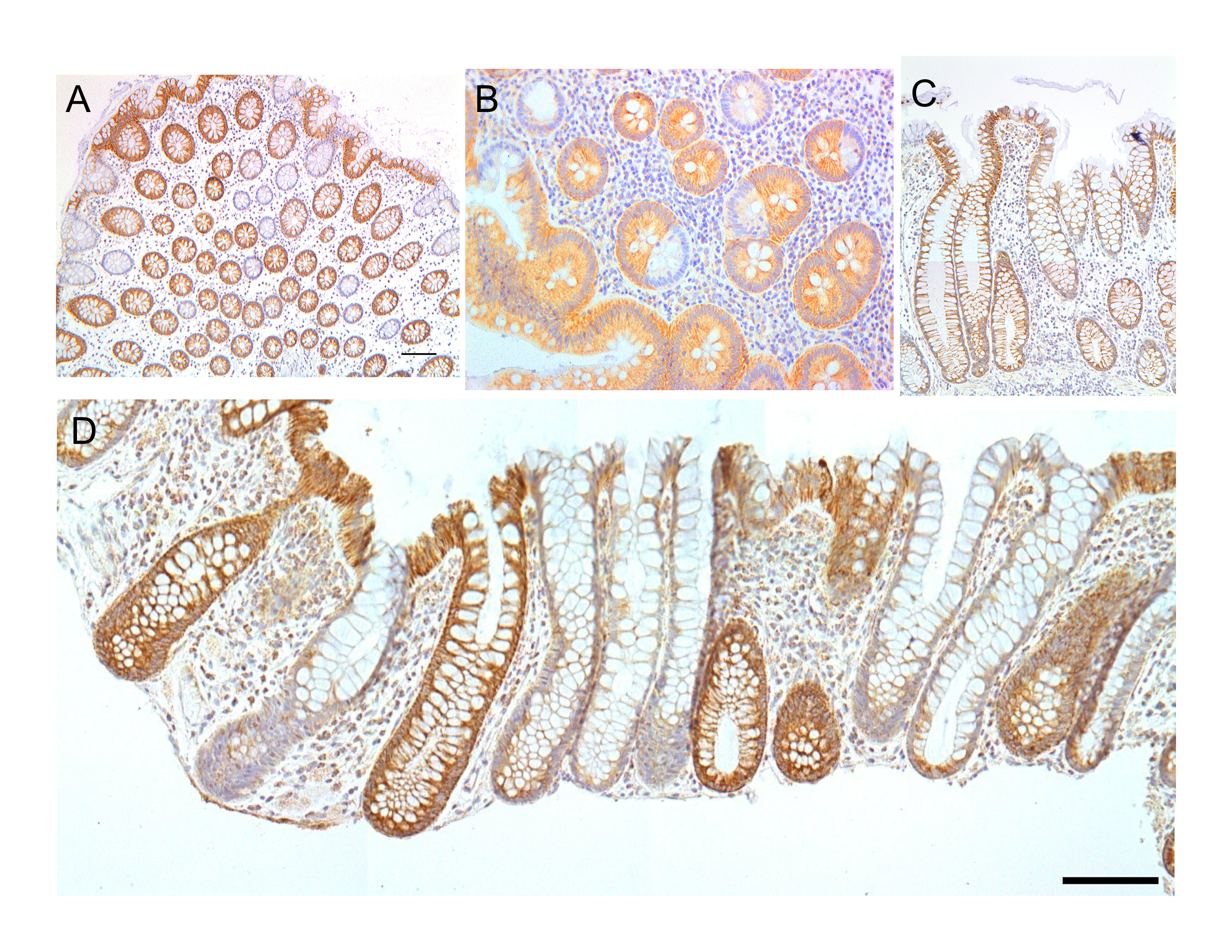
Colonic crypts (intestinal glands) within four tissue sections. The cells have been stained to show a brown-orange color if the cells produce the mitochondrial protein cytochrome c oxidase subunit I (CCOI), and the nuclei of the cells (located at the outer edges of the cells lining the walls of the crypts) are stained blue-gray with haematoxylin. Panels A, B were cut across the long axes of the crypts and panels C, D were cut parallel to the long axes of the crypts. In panel A the bar shows 100 μm and allows an estimate of the frequency of crypts in the colonic epithelium. Panel B includes three crypts in cross-section, each with one segment deficient for CCOI expression and at least one crypt, on the right side, undergoing fission into two crypts. Panel C shows, on the left side, a crypt fissioning into two crypts. Panel D shows typical small clusters of two and three CCOI deficient crypts (the bar shows 50 μm). The images were made from original photomicrographs, but panels A, B and D were also included in an article and illustrations were published with Creative Commons Attribution-Noncommercial License allowing re-use.

The wall of the large intestine is lined with simple columnar epithelium with invaginations. The invaginations are called the intestinal glands or colonic crypts.

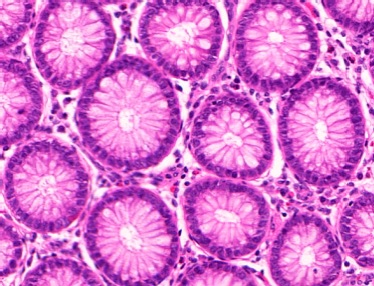
Micrograph of normal large instestinal crypts.

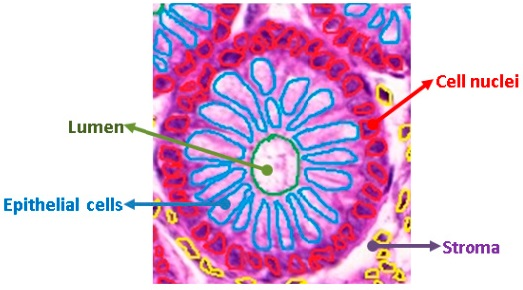
Anatomy of normal large intestinal crypts

The colon crypts are shaped like microscopic thick walled test tubes with a central hole down the length of the tube (the crypt lumen). Four tissue sections are shown here, two cut across the long axes of the crypts and two cut parallel to the long axes. In these images the cells have been stained by immunohistochemistry to show a brown-orange color if the cells produce a mitochondrial protein called cytochrome c oxidase subunit I (CCOI). The nuclei of the cells (located at the outer edges of the cells lining the walls of the crypts) are stained blue-gray with haematoxylin. As seen in panels C and D, crypts are about 75 to about 110 cells long. Baker et al. found that the average crypt circumference is 23 cells. Thus, by the images shown here, there are an average of about 1,725 to 2,530 cells per colonic crypt. Nooteboom et al. measuring the number of cells in a small number of crypts reported a range of 1,500 to 4,900 cells per colonic crypt. Cells are produced at the crypt base and migrate upward along the crypt axis before being shed into the colonic lumen days later. There are 5 to 6 stem cells at the bases of the crypts.

As estimated from the image in panel A, there are about 100 colonic crypts per square millimeter of the colonic epithelium. Since the average length of the human colon is 160.5 cm and the average inner circumference of the colon is 6.2 cm, the inner surface epithelial area of the human colon has an average area of about 995 cm^{2}, which includes 9,950,000 (close to 10 million) crypts.

In the four tissue sections shown here, many of the intestinal glands have cells with a mitochondrial DNA mutation in the CCOI gene and appear mostly white, with their main color being the blue-gray staining of the nuclei. As seen in panel B, a portion of the stem cells of three crypts appear to have a mutation in CCOI, so that 40% to 50% of the cells arising from those stem cells form a white segment in the cross cut area.

Overall, the percent of crypts deficient for CCOI is less than 1% before age 40, but then increases linearly with age. Colonic crypts deficient for CCOI in women reaches, on average, 18% in women and 23% in men by 80–84 years of age.

Crypts of the colon can reproduce by fission, as seen in panel C, where a crypt is fissioning to form two crypts, and in panel B where at least one crypt appears to be fissioning. Most crypts deficient in CCOI are in clusters of crypts (clones of crypts) with two or more CCOI-deficient crypts adjacent to each other (see panel D).

==== Mucosa ====
About 150 of the many thousands of protein coding genes expressed in the large intestine, some are specific to the mucous membrane in different regions and include CEACAM7.

== Function ==
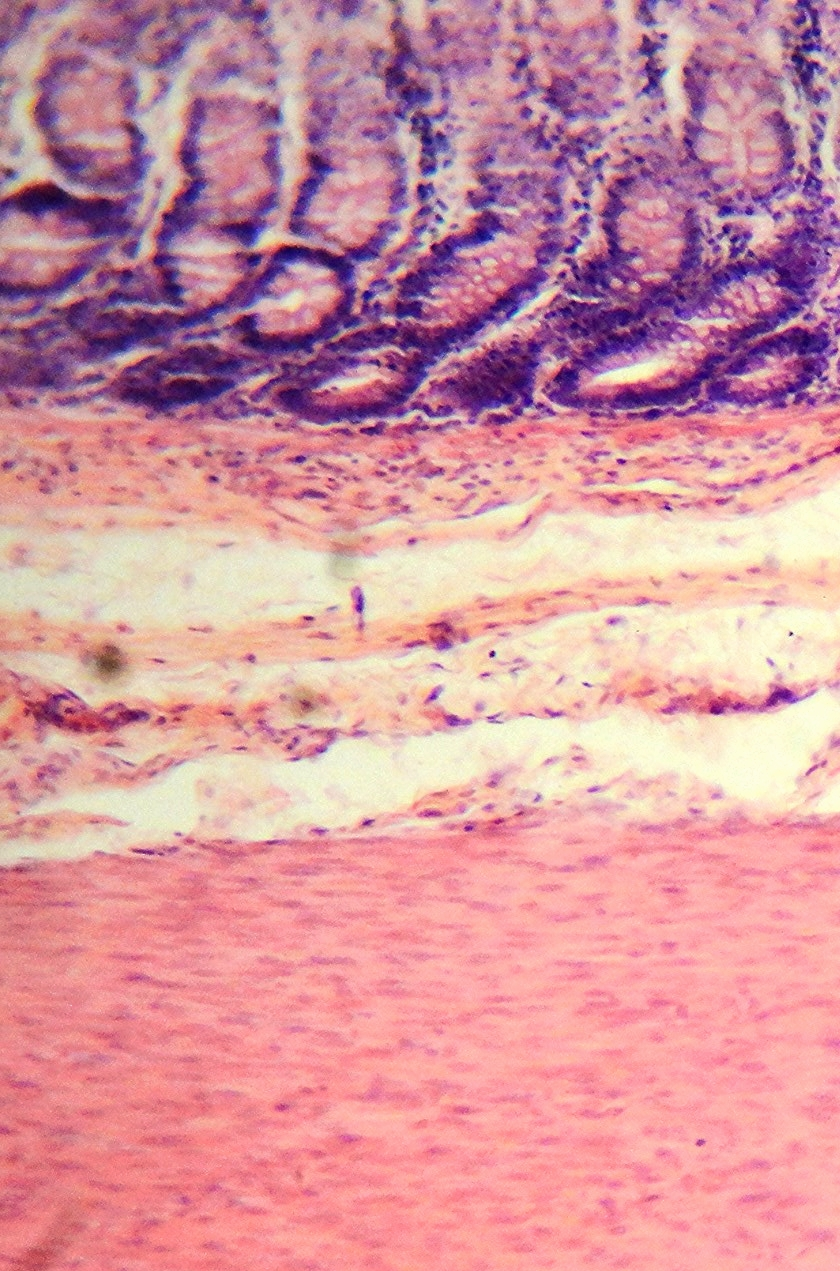
Histological section.

The large intestine absorbs water and any remaining absorbable nutrients from the food before sending the indigestible matter to the rectum. The colon absorbs vitamins that are created by the colonic bacteria, such as thiamine, riboflavin, and vitamin K. It also compacts feces, and stores fecal matter in the rectum until it can be discharged via the anus in defecation.

The large intestine also secretes potassium and chloride. Recycling of various nutrients takes place in the colon. Examples include fermentation of carbohydrates, short chain fatty acids, and urea cycling.

The appendix contains a small amount of mucosa-associated lymphoid tissue which gives the appendix an undetermined role in immunity. However, the appendix is known to be important in fetal life as it contains endocrine cells that release biogenic amines and peptide hormones important for homeostasis during early growth and development.

By the time chyme enters the large intestine, the small intestine has absorbed nearly all digestible nutrients and approximately 90% of the ingested water, based on volume measurements showing that only about 1–2 litres of fluid pass into the colon from a daily intestinal load of roughly 9–10 litres. Indeed, as demonstrated by the commonality of ileostomy procedures, it is possible for many people to live without large portions of their large intestine, or even without it completely. At this point only some electrolytes like sodium, magnesium, and chloride are left as well as indigestible parts of ingested food (e.g., a large part of ingested amylose, starch which has been shielded from digestion heretofore, and dietary fiber, which is largely indigestible carbohydrate in either soluble or insoluble form). As the chyme moves through the large intestine, most of the remaining water is removed, while the chyme is mixed with mucus and bacteria (known as gut flora), and becomes feces. The ascending colon receives fecal material as a liquid. The muscles of the colon then move the watery waste material forward and slowly absorb all the excess water, causing the stools to gradually solidify as they move along into the descending colon.

The bacteria break down some of the fiber for their own nourishment and create acetate, propionate, and butyrate as waste products, which in turn are used by the cell lining of the colon for nourishment. No protein is made available. In humans, perhaps 10% of the undigested carbohydrate thus becomes available, though this may vary with diet; in other animals, including other apes and primates, who have proportionally larger colons, more is made available, thus permitting a higher portion of plant material in the diet. The large intestine produces no digestive enzymes — chemical digestion is completed in the small intestine before the chyme reaches the large intestine. The pH in the colon varies between 5.5 and 7 (slightly acidic to neutral).

=== Standing gradient osmosis ===
Water absorption at the colon typically proceeds against a transmucosal osmotic pressure gradient. The standing gradient osmosis is the reabsorption of water against the osmotic gradient in the intestines. Cells occupying the intestinal lining pump sodium ions into the intercellular space, raising the osmolarity of the intercellular fluid. This hypertonic fluid creates an osmotic pressure that drives water into the lateral intercellular spaces by osmosis via tight junctions and adjacent cells, which then in turn moves across the basement membrane and into the capillaries, while more sodium ions are pumped again into the intercellular fluid. Although water travels down an osmotic gradient in each individual step, overall, water usually travels against the osmotic gradient due to the pumping of sodium ions into the intercellular fluid. This allows the large intestine to absorb water despite the blood in capillaries being hypotonic compared to the fluid within the intestinal lumen.

=== Gut flora ===
The large intestine houses over 700 species of bacteria that perform a variety of functions, as well as fungi, protozoa, and archaea. Species diversity varies by geography and diet. The microbes in a human distal gut often number in the vicinity of 100 trillion, and can weigh around 200 grams (0.44 pounds). This mass of mostly symbiotic microbes has recently been called the latest human organ to be "discovered" or in other words, the "forgotten organ".

The large intestine absorbs some of the products formed by the bacteria inhabiting this region. Undigested polysaccharides (fiber) are metabolized to short-chain fatty acids by bacteria in the large intestine and absorbed by passive diffusion. The bicarbonate that the large intestine secretes helps to neutralize the increased acidity resulting from the formation of these fatty acids.

These bacteria also produce large amounts of vitamins, especially vitamin K and biotin (a B vitamin), for absorption into the blood. Although this source of vitamins, in general, provides only a small part of the daily requirement, it makes a significant contribution when dietary vitamin intake is low. An individual who depends on absorption of vitamins formed by bacteria in the large intestine may become vitamin-deficient if treated with antibiotics that inhibit the vitamin producing species of bacteria as well as the intended disease-causing bacteria.

Other bacterial products include gas (flatus), which is a mixture of nitrogen and carbon dioxide, with small amounts of the gases hydrogen, methane, and hydrogen sulfide. Bacterial fermentation of undigested polysaccharides produces these. Some of the fecal odor is due to indoles, metabolized from the amino acid tryptophan. The normal flora is also essential in the development of certain tissues, including the cecum and lymphatics.

They are also involved in the production of cross-reactive antibodies. These are antibodies produced by the immune system against the normal flora, that are also effective against related pathogens, thereby preventing infection or invasion.

The two most prevalent phyla of the colon are Bacillota and Bacteroidota. The ratio between the two seems to vary widely as reported by the Human Microbiome Project. Bacteroides are implicated in the initiation of colitis and colon cancer. Bifidobacteria are also abundant, and are often described as 'friendly bacteria'.

A mucus layer protects the large intestine from attacks from colonic commensal bacteria.

== Clinical significance ==
=== Disease ===
Following are the most common diseases or disorders of the colon:

- Angiodysplasia of the colon
- Appendicitis
- Chronic functional abdominal pain
- Colitis
- Colorectal cancer
- Colorectal polyp
- Constipation
- Crohn's disease
- Diarrhea
- Diverticulitis
- Diverticulosis
- Hirschsprung's disease (aganglionosis)
- Ileus
- Intussusception
- Irritable bowel syndrome
- Pseudomembranous colitis
- Ulcerative colitis and toxic megacolon

=== Colonoscopy ===
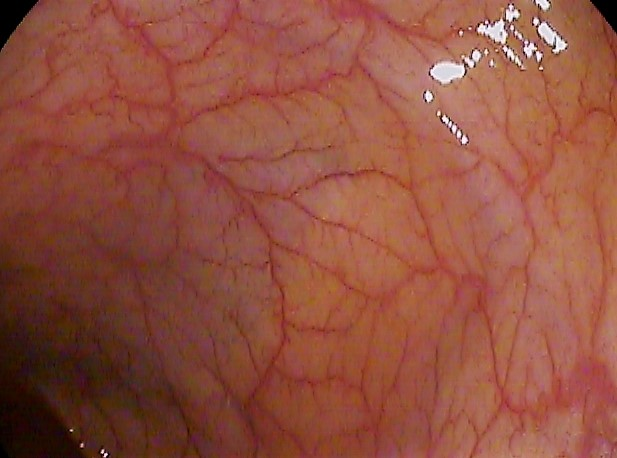
Colonoscopy image, splenic flexure, normal mucosa. The spleen can be seen through it

Colonoscopy is the endoscopic examination of the large intestine and the distal part of the small bowel with a CCD camera or a fiber optic camera on a flexible tube passed through the anus. It can provide a visual diagnosis (e.g. ulceration, polyps) and grants the opportunity for biopsy or removal of suspected colorectal cancer lesions. Colonoscopy can remove polyps as small as one millimetre or less. Once polyps are removed, they can be studied with the aid of a microscope to determine if they are precancerous or not. It takes 15 years or fewer for a polyp to turn cancerous.

Colonoscopy is similar to sigmoidoscopy—the difference being related to which parts of the colon each can examine. A colonoscopy allows an examination of the entire colon (1200–1500 mm in length). A sigmoidoscopy allows an examination of the distal portion (about 600 mm) of the colon, which may be sufficient because benefits to cancer survival of colonoscopy have been limited to the detection of lesions in the distal portion of the colon.

A sigmoidoscopy is often used as a screening procedure for a full colonoscopy, often done in conjunction with a stool-based test such as a fecal occult blood test (FOBT), fecal immunochemical test (FIT), or multi-target stool DNA test (Cologuard) or blood-based test, SEPT9 DNA methylation test (Epi proColon). About 5% of these screened patients are referred to colonoscopy.

Virtual colonoscopy, which uses 2D and 3D imagery reconstructed from computed tomography (CT) scans or from nuclear magnetic resonance (MR) scans, is also possible, as a totally non-invasive medical test, although it is not standard and still under investigation regarding its diagnostic abilities. Furthermore, virtual colonoscopy does not allow for therapeutic maneuvers such as polyp/tumour removal or biopsy nor visualization of lesions smaller than 5 millimeters. If a growth or polyp is detected using CT colonography, a standard colonoscopy would still need to be performed. Additionally, surgeons have lately been using the term pouchoscopy to refer to a colonoscopy of the ileo-anal pouch.

== Other animals ==
The large intestine is truly distinct only in tetrapods, in which it is almost always separated from the small intestine by an ileocecal valve. In most vertebrates, however, it is a relatively short structure running directly to the anus, although noticeably wider than the small intestine. Although the cecum is present in most amniotes, only in mammals does the remainder of the large intestine develop into a true colon.

In some small mammals, the colon is straight, as it is in other tetrapods, but, in the majority of mammalian species, it is divided into ascending and descending portions; a distinct transverse colon is typically present only in primates. However, the taeniae coli and accompanying haustra are not found in either carnivorans or ruminants. The rectum of mammals (other than monotremes) is derived from the cloaca of other vertebrates, and is, therefore, not truly homologous with the "rectum" found in these species.

In some fish, there is no true large intestine, but simply a short rectum connecting the end of the digestive part of the gut to the cloaca. In sharks, this includes a rectal gland that secretes salt to help the animal maintain osmotic balance with the seawater. The gland somewhat resembles a caecum in structure but is not a homologous structure.

== Additional images ==
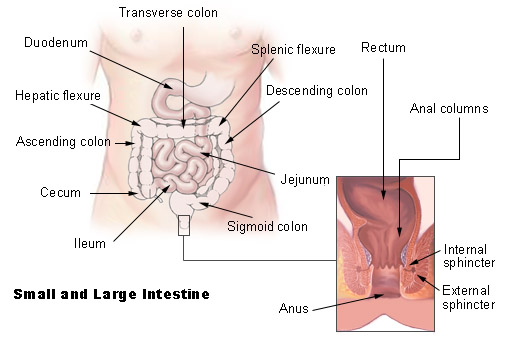
Intestines

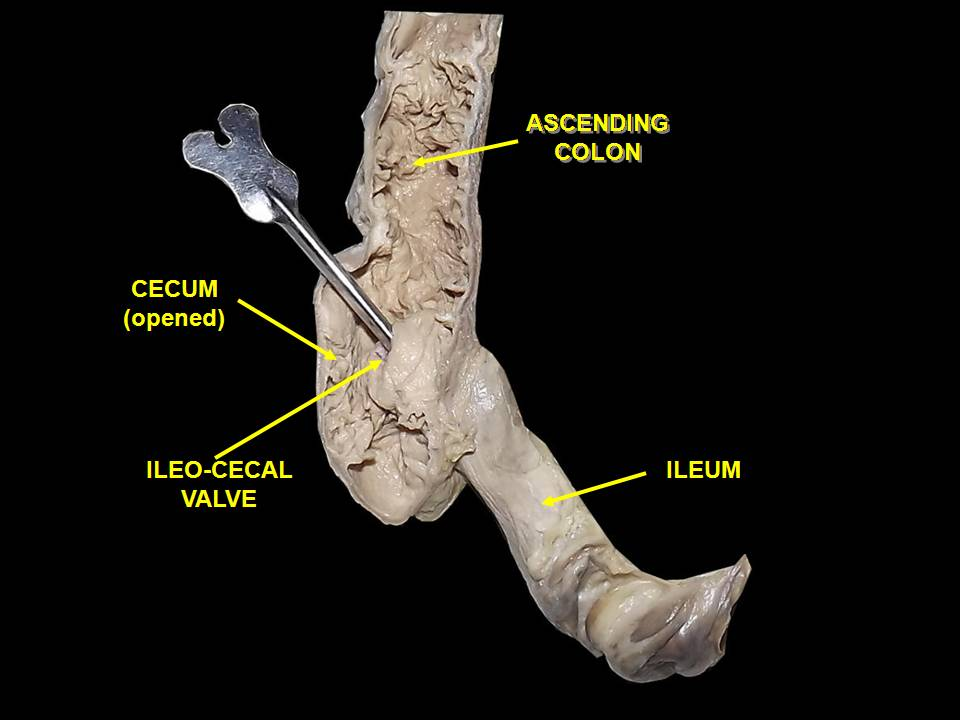
Colon. Deep dissection. Anterior view.

== See also ==
- Colectomy
- Colonic ulcer
- Large intestine (Chinese medicine)
