= Colic flexures =

Two abrupt bends in the large intestine

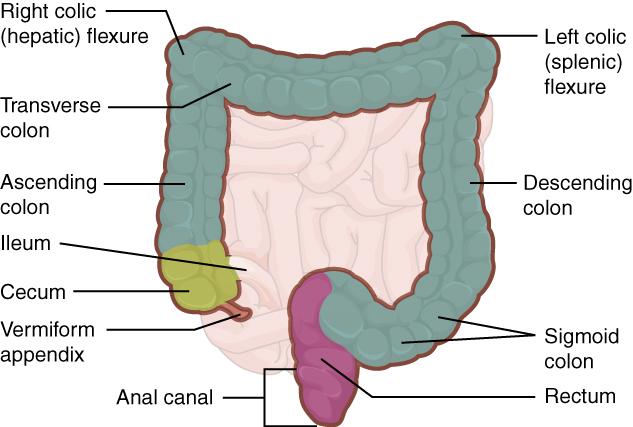
- The hepatic and splenic flexures labelled at either side of transverse colon

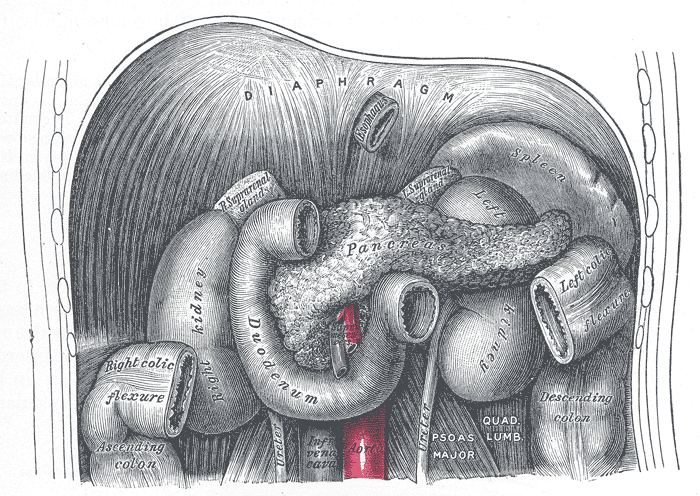
- Front of abdomen, showing surface markings for liver, stomach, duodenum, pancreas, colon

Details
- Precursor: Hindgut
- Artery: Right colic artery (right flexure), and left colic artery (left flexure)

Identifiers
- Latin: flexura coli
- FMA: 14555

In the anatomy of the human digestive tract, there are two colic flexures, or curvatures in the transverse colon. The right colic flexure is also known as the hepatic flexure, and the left colic flexure is also known as the splenic flexure.

== Structure ==
=== Right colic flexure ===
The right colic flexure or hepatic flexure (as it is next to the liver) is the sharp bend between the ascending colon and the transverse colon. The hepatic flexure lies in the right upper quadrant of the human abdomen. It receives blood supply from the superior mesenteric artery.

=== Left colic flexure ===
The left colic flexure or splenic flexure (as it is close to the spleen) is the sharp bend between the transverse colon and the descending colon. The splenic flexure receives dual blood supply from the terminal branches of the superior mesenteric artery and the inferior mesenteric artery.

== Clinical significance ==
The splenic flexure is the last and highest positioned flexure in the colon. Gas can build up at this flexure and give abdominal pain giving rise to a condition known as splenic flexure syndrome. Splenic flexure syndrome is often found in those with irritable bowel syndrome (IBS), and is considered by some practitioners to be a type of IBS since it can also result from stress.

The splenic flexure is a watershed region as it receives dual blood supply from the terminal branches of the superior mesenteric artery and the inferior mesenteric artery, thus making it prone to ischemic damage in cases of low blood pressure because it does not have its own primary source of blood. In the context of bowel ischemia in particular ischemic colitis, the splenic flexure is sometimes referred to as Griffith's point, along with the upper rectum (Sudeck's point).

Colic flexures, along with other acute-angle bends in the colon (sometimes also termed "flexures"), can interfere with colonoscopy.

== Additional images ==
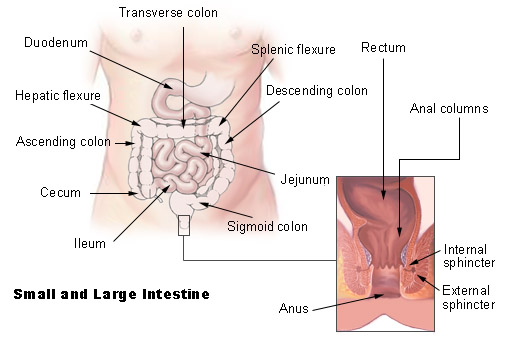
Intestines

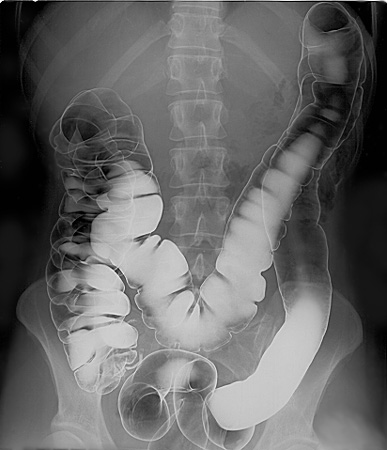
Double contrast barium enema, using positive and negative contrast
