= Middle colic vein =

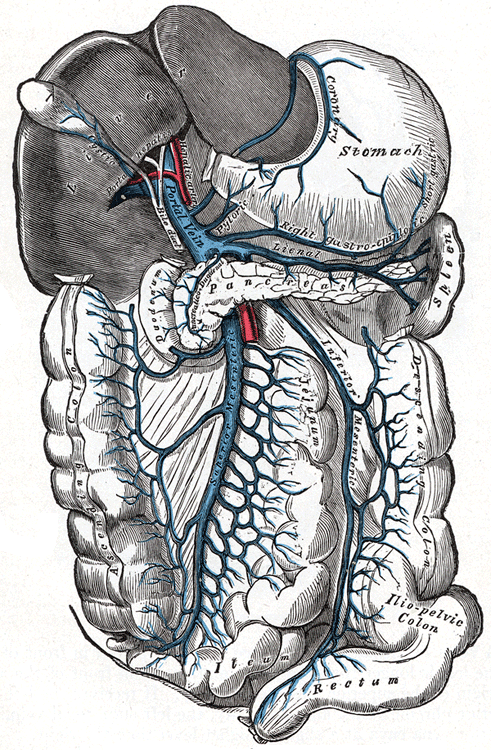
- Portal vein and tributaries. (Middle colic vein hidden behind pancreas, but it is possible to see where it drains to the superior mesenteric.)

Details
- Drains from: Transverse colon
- Drains to: Superior mesenteric vein
- Artery: Middle colic artery

Identifiers
- Latin: vena colica media
- TA98: A12.3.12.027
- TA2: 5122
- FMA: 15406

The middle colic vein drains the transverse colon. It is a tributary of the superior mesenteric vein, and follows the path of its corresponding artery, the middle colic artery. As the superior mesenteric vein drains to the hepatic portal vein, the middle colic vein is considered part of the hepatic portal system. This vein also carries nutrients absorbed from the large intestine to the liver.

This vein is sometimes used as the point of catheter insertion for treatment of acute portal and mesenteric vein thrombosis.
