= Middle colic artery =

Artery supplying the colon

- The superior mesenteric artery and its branches. (Middle colic visible at center top.)

- Colonic blood supply (Middle colic artery is #6)

Details
- Source: Superior mesenteric artery
- Vein: Middle colic vein
- Supplies: Transverse colon

Identifiers
- Latin: arteria colica media
- TA98: A12.2.12.067
- TA2: 4265
- FMA: 14810

The middle colic artery is an artery of the abdomen; a branch of the superior mesenteric artery distributed to parts of the ascending and transverse colon. It usually divides into two terminal branches - a left one and a right one - which go on to form anastomoses with the left colic artery, and right colic artery (respectively), thus participating in the formation of the marginal artery of the colon.

Parts of the artery may be removed in different types of hemicolectomy.

== Structure ==
The middle colic artery supplies the superior/distal part of the ascending colon and right/proximal two-thirds of the transverse colon.

=== Origin ===
The middle colic artery is a branch of the superior mesenteric artery, branching off from its right aspect. Its origin is situated just inferior the neck of the pancreas. It may share a common origin with the right colic artery.

=== Course ===
The middle colic artery passes anterosuperiorly between the layers of the transverse mesocolon just right of the midline before dividing into left and right terminal branches.

=== Branches and anastomoses ===
The anastomotic arches formed by the left and right branches of the middle colic artery are about two fingers' breadth from the transverse colon, to which they distribute branches.

The sequence of anastomoses of the branches of the middle colic artery constitutes part of the marginal artery of the colon.

==== Left branch ====
The left branch anastomoses with a branch of the left colic artery (in turn a branch of the inferior mesenteric artery) near the left colic flexure, forming the arc of Riolan.

==== Right branch ====
The right branch anastomoses with the ascending branch of the right colic artery.

=== Variation ===
Alternate origin

The middle colic artery may rarely instead arise from the abdominal aorta, inferior mesenteric artery, dorsal pancreatic artery, hepatic artery proper, left colic artery, or splenic artery.

Accessory middle colic artery

An accessory middle colic artery in encountered in 10-20% of individuals. The accessory artery may arise from the superior mesenteric artery proximal to the middle colic artery proper, and from the abdominal aorta, inferior mesenteric artery, dorsal pancreatic artery, hepatic artery proper, or left colic artery. An accessory middle colic directly originated from the superior mesenteric artery occurred in 18% of individuals.

Number of terminal branches

The middle colic artery may occasionally divide into 3 or more branches (in which case the two lateral-most branches are the ones forming the anastomoses).

== Clinical significance ==
In a right hemicolectomy to remove the caecum and the ascending colon, the right branch of the middle colic artery is ligated and removed. In a transverse hemicolectomy, the entire middle colic artery may need to be ligated and removed.

== See also ==
- Marginal artery of the colon
