= Inferior mesenteric artery =

Branch of the abdominal aorta supplying part of the large intestine

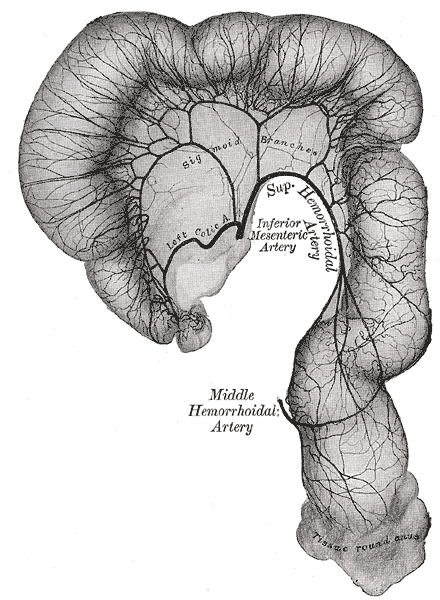
- Sigmoid colon and rectum, showing distribution of branches of inferior mesenteric artery and their anastomoses. (Inferior mesenteric artery labeled at center.)

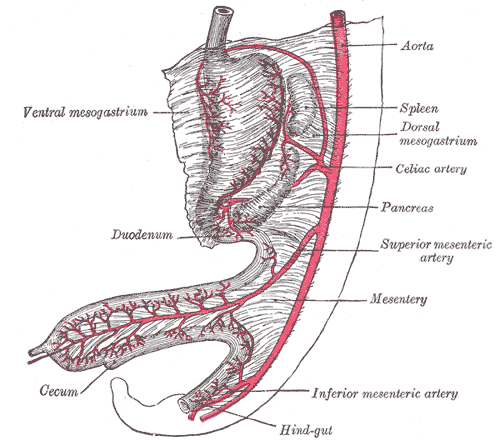
- Abdominal part of digestive tube and its attachment to the primitive or common mesentery. Human embryo of six weeks. (Inferior mesenteric artery labeled at bottom right.)

Details
- Precursor: Vitelline arteries
- Source: Abdominal aorta
- Branches: Left colic artery, sigmoid branches, superior rectal artery
- Vein: Inferior mesenteric vein
- Supplies: Large Intestine

Identifiers
- Latin: arteria mesenterica inferior
- MeSH: D017537
- TA98: A12.2.12.069
- TA2: 4291
- FMA: 14750

In human anatomy, the inferior mesenteric artery (IMA) is the third main branch of the abdominal aorta and arises at the level of L3, supplying the large intestine from the distal transverse colon to the upper part of the anal canal. The regions supplied by the IMA are the descending colon, the sigmoid colon, and part of the rectum.

== Structure ==
=== Origin ===
The IMA arises from the anterior aspect of the abdominal aorta.

The vertebral level of its origin is situated at L3 (subcostal plane), below the origins of the two renal arteries, 3.8 cm (1 and a half inches) above the aortic bifurcation, at the level of the umbilicus (transumbilical plane), and posterior to the inferior border of the horizontal (III) part of the duodenum.

=== Branches ===
Along its course, the IMA has the following branches:

Branch	notes
left colic artery	supplies descending colon
sigmoid branches	the most superior being described as 'the superior sigmoid artery'
superior rectal artery	effectively the terminal branch of the IMA (the continuation of the IMA after all other branches)

All these arterial branches further divide into arcades which then supply the colon at regular intervals.

=== Relations ===
The IMA is accompanied along its course by a similarly named vein, the inferior mesenteric vein, which drains into the splenic vein. The IMV drains to the portal vein and does therefore not fully mirror the course of the IMA.

=== Distribution ===
Proximally, its territory of distribution overlaps (forms a watershed) with the middle colic artery, and therefore the superior mesenteric artery. The SMA and IMA anastomose via the marginal artery of the colon (artery of Drummond) and via Riolan's arcade (also called the "meandering artery", an arterial connection between the left colic artery and the middle colic artery). The territory of distribution of the IMA is more or less equivalent to the embryonic hindgut.

== Clinical significance ==
The IMA and/or its branches must be resected for a left hemicolectomy.

A horseshoe kidney, a common (1 in 500) anomaly of the kidneys, will be positioned below the IMA.

== Additional images ==
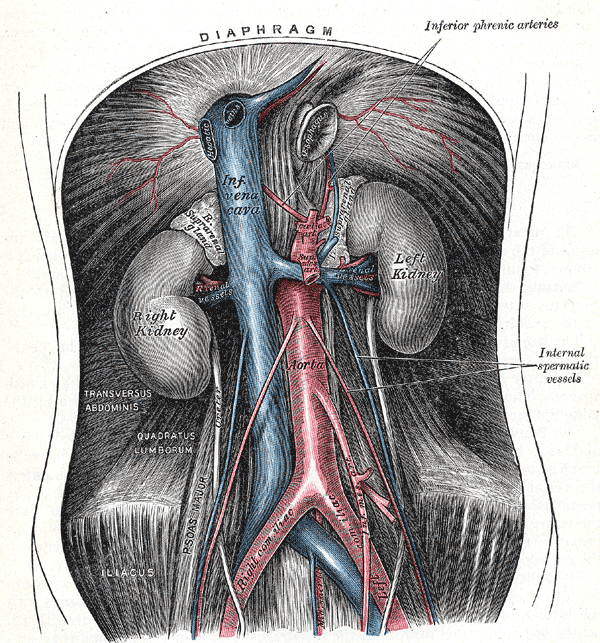
The abdominal aorta and its branches.

The inferior mesenteric artery and its branches.

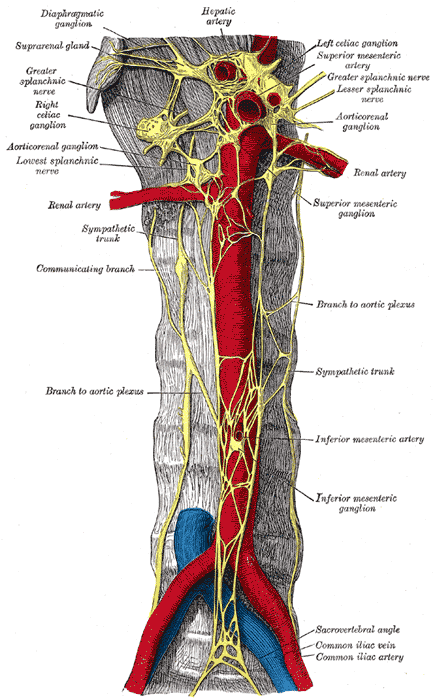
Abdominal portion of the sympathetic trunk, with the celiac plexus and hypogastric plexus.

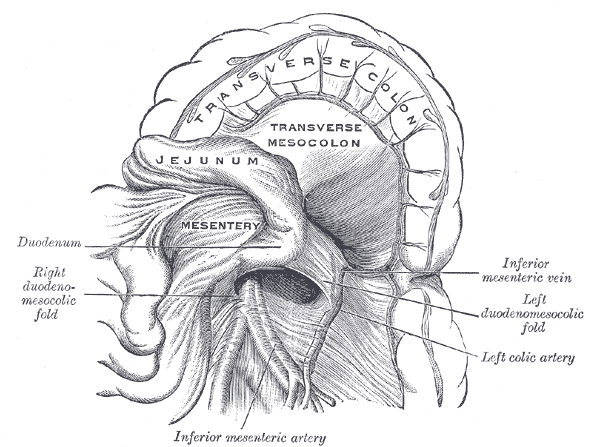
Duodenojejunal fossa.

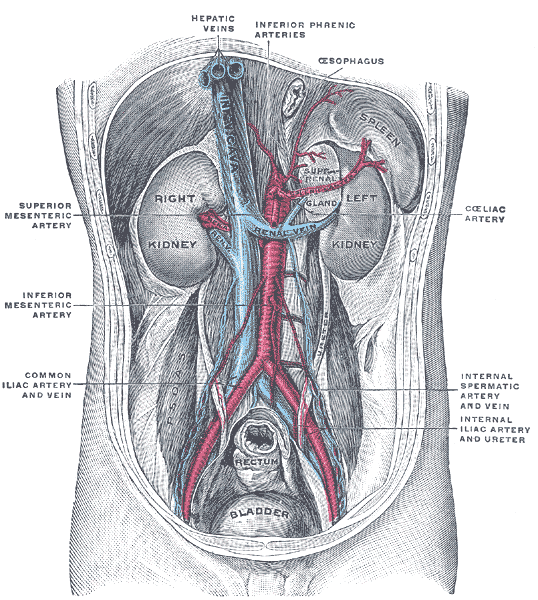
Posterior abdominal wall, after removal of the peritoneum, showing kidneys, suprarenal capsules, and great vessels.

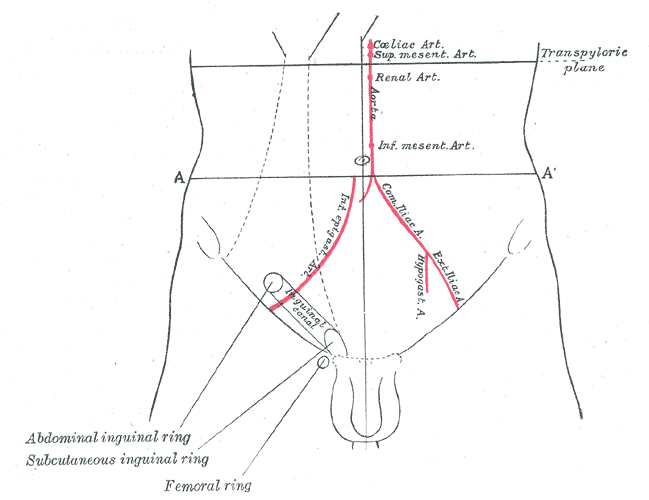
Front of abdomen, showing surface markings for arteries and inguinal canal.

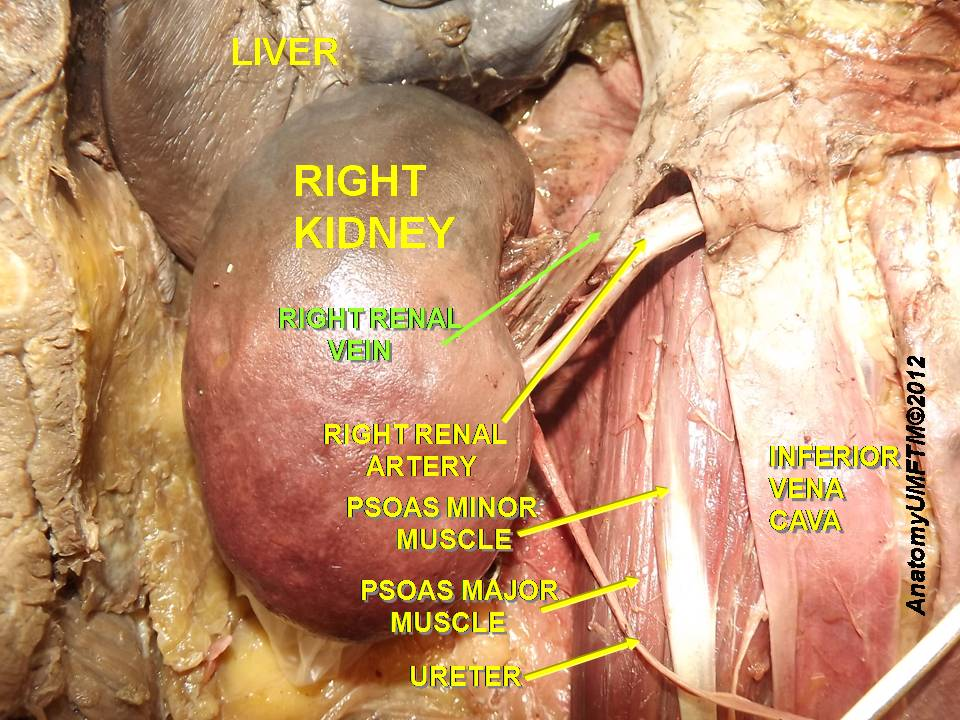
Inferior mesenteric artery

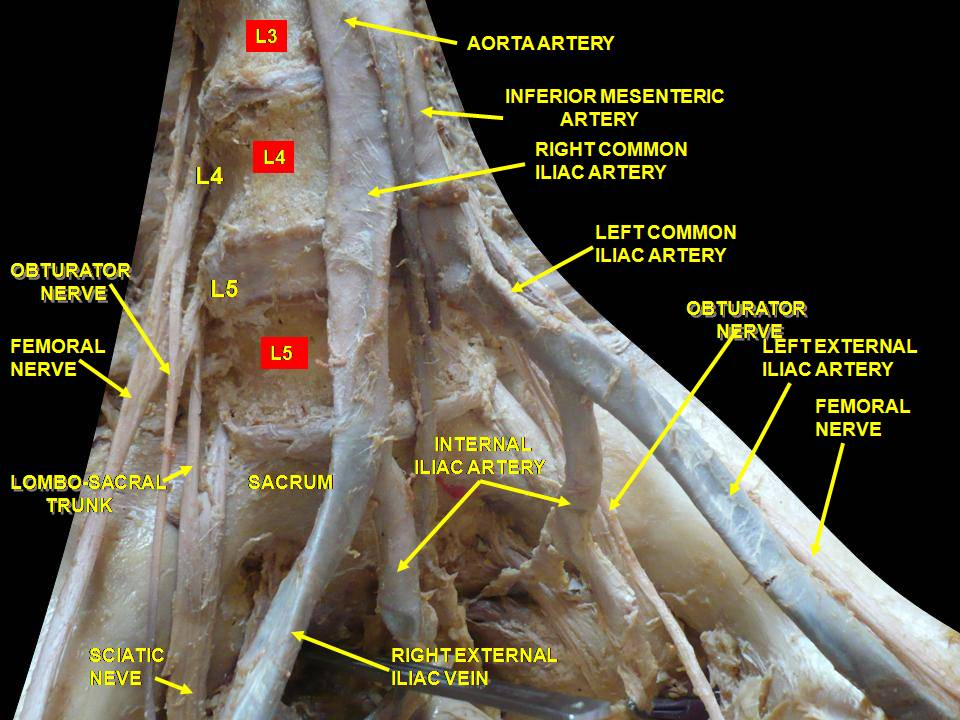
Lumbar and sacral plexus. Deep dissection.Anterior view.

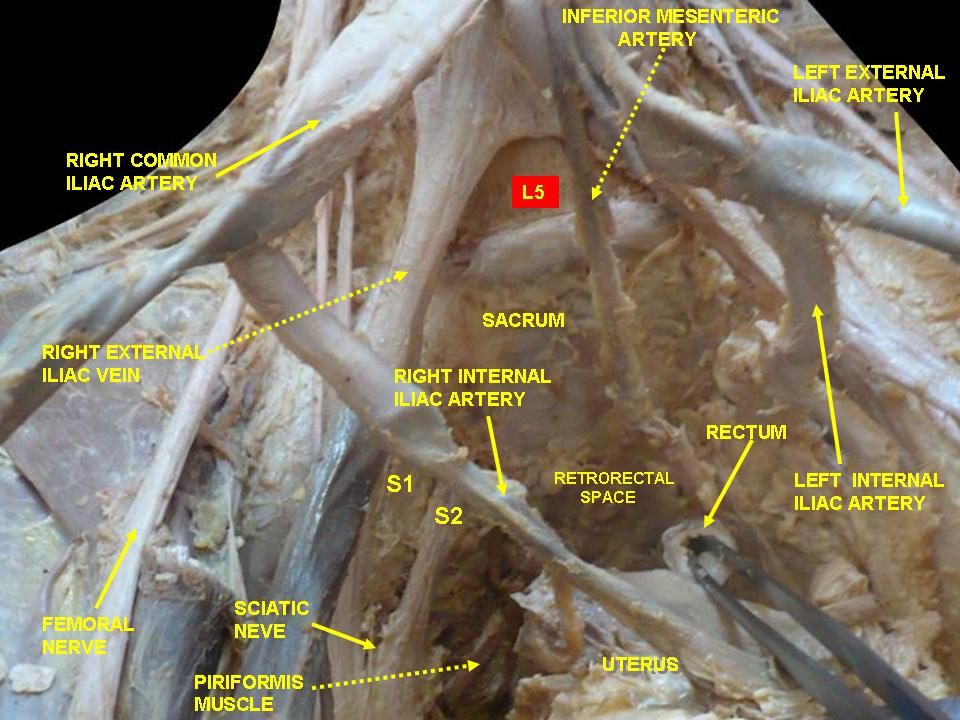
Lumbar and sacral plexus. Deep dissection.Anterior view.

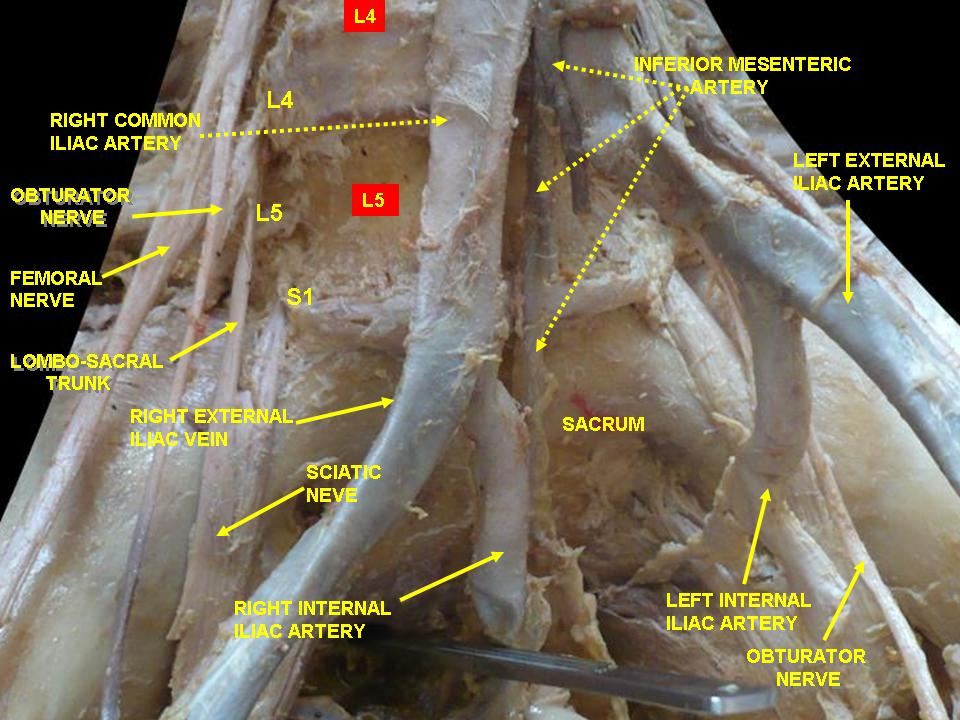
Lumbar and sacral plexus. Deep dissection.Anterior view.

== See also ==
- Superior mesenteric artery
