= Hindgut =

Posterior part of the alimentary canal

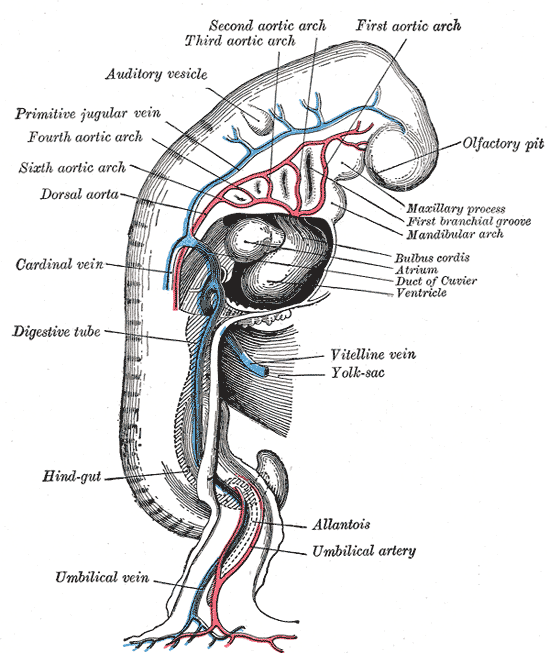
- Profile view of a human embryo estimated at twenty or twenty-one days old. (Hindgut labeled at lower left.)

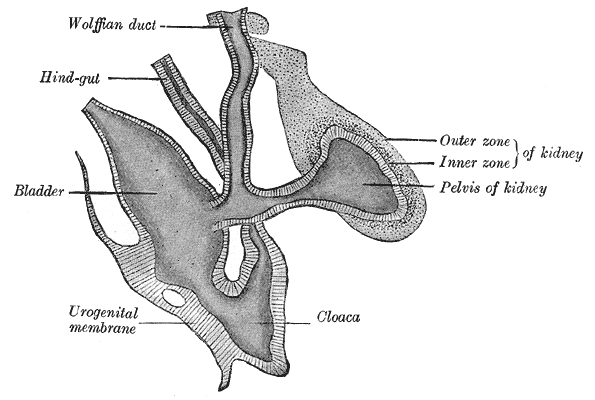
- Primitive kidney and bladder, from a reconstruction. (Hindgut labeled at upper left.)

Details
- Carnegie stage: 10
- Precursor: Mesenchyme
- Gives rise to: Transverse colon, descending colon, sigmoid colon, rectum

Identifiers
- Latin: metenteron
- TE: E5.4.9.0.2.0.1
- FMA: 45618

The hindgut (or epigaster) is the posterior (caudal) part of the alimentary canal. In mammals, it includes the distal one third of the transverse colon and the splenic flexure, the descending colon, sigmoid colon and up to the ano-rectal junction. In zoology, the term hindgut refers also to the cecum and ascending colon.

== Structure ==
=== Blood supply ===
Arterial supply is by the inferior mesenteric artery, and venous drainage is to the portal venous system. Lymphatic drainage is to the chyle cistern.

=== Nerve supply ===
The hindgut is innervated via the inferior mesenteric plexus. Sympathetic innervation is from the lumbar splanchnic nerves (L1-L2), parasympathetic innervation is from S2-S4.

== Additional images ==
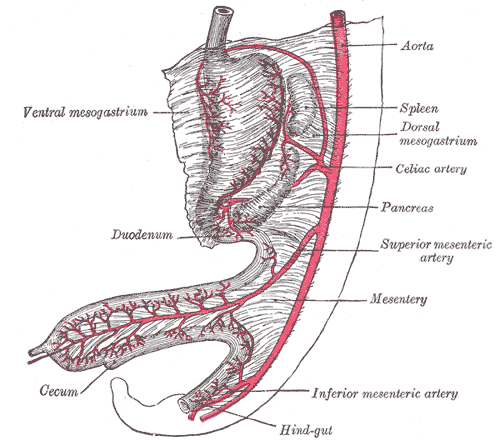
Abdominal part of digestive tube and its attachment to the primitive or common mesentery. Human embryo of six weeks.

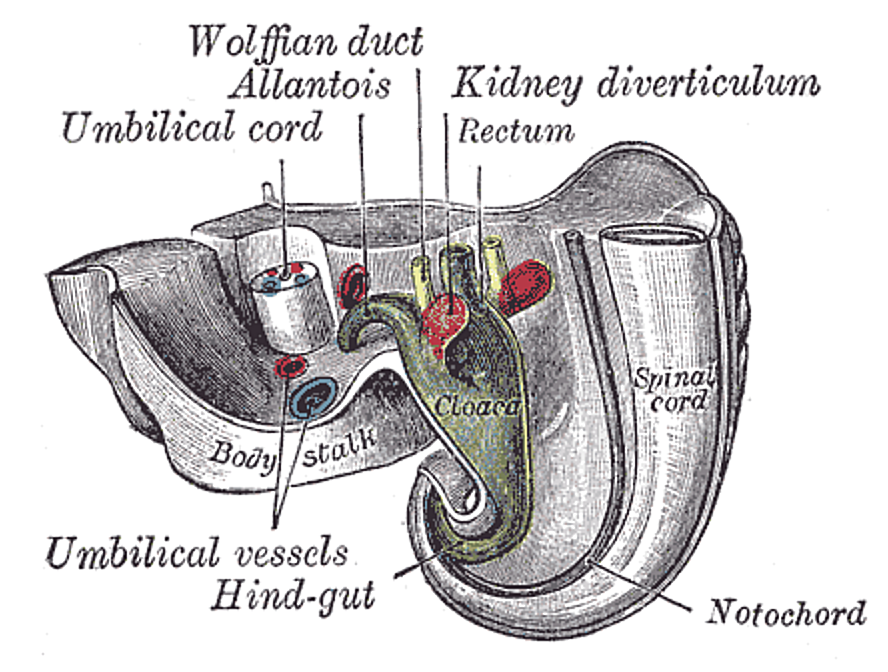
Tail end of human embryo twenty-five to twenty-nine days old.

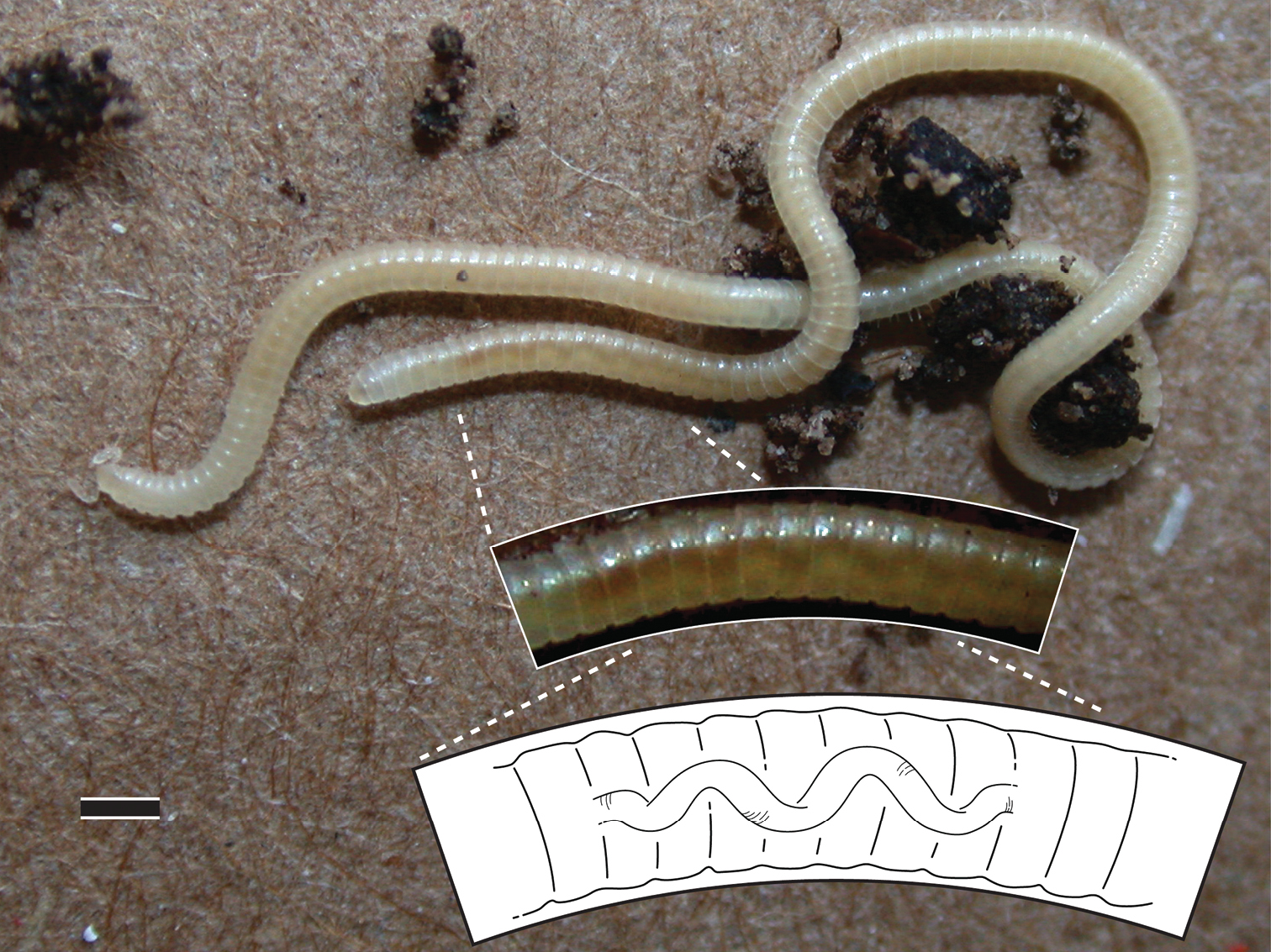
Metenteron in the milliped Illacme plenipes.

== See also ==
- Hindgut fermentation
