= Left colic artery =

Artery

- The inferior mesenteric artery and its branches. (Left colic visible at center right.)

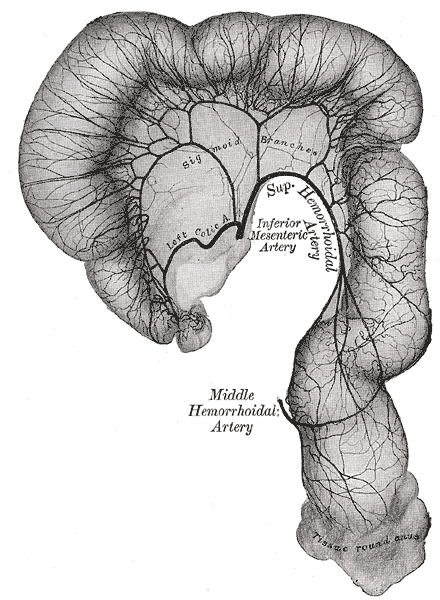
- Sigmoid colon and rectum, showing distribution of branches of inferior mesenteric artery and their anastomoses. (Left colic visible at center left.)

Details
- Source: Inferior mesenteric
- Vein: Left colic vein
- Supplies: Descending colon

Identifiers
- Latin: arteria colica sinistra
- TA98: A12.2.12.071
- TA2: 4292
- FMA: 14826

The left colic artery is a branch of the inferior mesenteric artery distributed to the descending colon, and left part of the transverse colon. It ends by dividing into an ascending branch and a descending branch; the terminal branches of the two branches go on to form anastomoses with the middle colic artery, and a sigmoid artery (respectively).

== Structure ==
The left colic artery usually represents the dominant arterial supply to the left colic flexure.

=== Course ===
The left colic artery passes to the left posterior to the peritoneum. After a short but variable course, it divides into an ascending branch and a descending branch.

=== Branches and anastomoses ===
==== Ascending branch ====
The ascending branch passes superior-ward. It passes anterior to the (ipsilateral) psoas major muscle, gonadal vessels, ureter, and kidney; it passes posterior to the inferior mesenteric vein. Its terminal branches form anastomoses with those of the middle colic artery; it also forms anastomoses with the descending branch (of the left colic artery).

==== Descending branch ====
The descending branch passes inferolaterally. It forms anastomoses with the superior-most sigmoid artery as well as the ascending branch (of the left colic artery), thereby participating in the formation of the marginal artery of the colon.

=== Variation ===
The left colic artery may have a common origin with a sigmoid artery, or may arise by branching of from a sigmoid artery. Occasionally, the left colic artery may arise from either the superior mesenteric artery, the middle colic artery, or the proximal-most jejunal artery; rarely, an accessory left colic artery may arise from the aforementioned arteries. An accessory left colic artery may also arise from the left colic artery itself.

== Clinical significance ==
The left colic artery may be ligated during abdominal surgery to remove colorectal cancer. This may have poorer outcomes than preserving the artery.

== Additional images ==
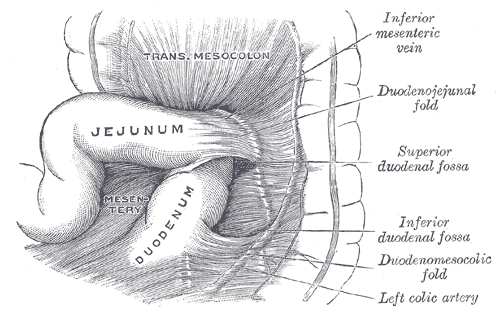
Superior and inferior duodenal fossæ.

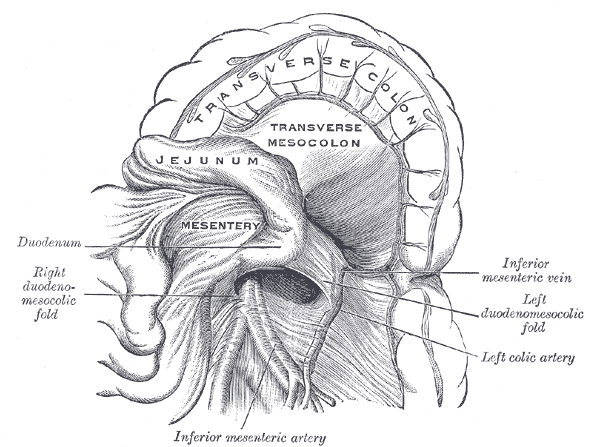
Duodenojejunal fossa.
