= Superior mesenteric artery =

Artery which supplies blood to the intestines and pancreas

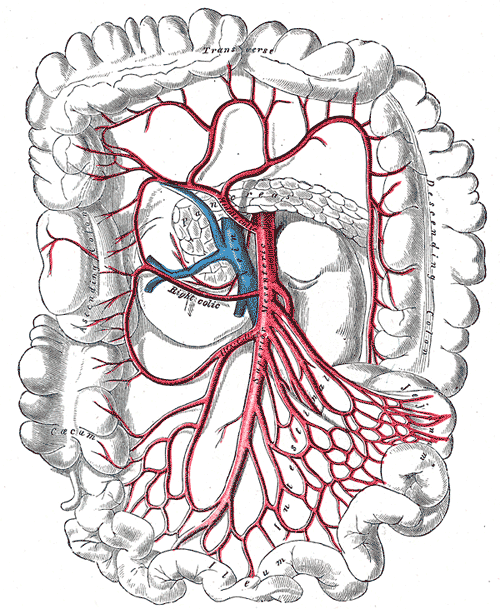
- Frontal view of the superior mesenteric artery and its branches. The large vessel (blue) beside the SMA is the superior mesenteric vein. A considerable number of different branching patterns exist.

- 3D-rendered computed tomography of abdominal aortic branches, showing exit of superior mesenteric artery between the kidneys.

Details
- Precursor: Vitelline arteries
- Source: Abdominal aorta
- Branches: Inferior pancreaticoduodenal middle colic right colic intestinal branches (jejunal, ileal) ileocolic Marginal artery of the colon
- Vein: Superior mesenteric vein
- Supplies: Intestine

Identifiers
- Latin: arteria mesenterica superior
- MeSH: D017538
- TA98: A12.2.12.053
- TA2: 4252
- FMA: 14749

In human anatomy, the superior mesenteric artery (SMA) is an artery which arises from the anterior surface of the abdominal aorta, just inferior to the origin of the celiac trunk, and supplies blood to the intestine from the lower part of the duodenum through two-thirds of the transverse colon, as well as the pancreas.

== Structure ==
=== Origin ===
In the adult, the SMA arises anterior to inferior border of vertebra L1 (transpyloric plane). It is usually 1 cm lower than the celiac trunk.

=== Course and relations ===
It initially travels in an anterior/inferior direction, passing behind/under the neck of the pancreas and the splenic vein. Located under this portion of the superior mesenteric artery, between it and the aorta, are the following:

- left renal vein - travels between the left kidney and the inferior vena cava (can be compressed between the SMA and the abdominal aorta at this location, leading to nutcracker syndrome).
- the third part of the duodenum, a segment of the small intestines (can be compressed by the SMA at this location, leading to superior mesenteric artery syndrome).
- uncinate process of pancreas - this is a small part of the pancreas that hooks around the SMA.

The SMA typically runs to the left of its associated vein, the superior mesenteric vein. After passing the neck of the pancreas it starts giving off its branches.

=== Branches ===
Branch	Supplies
inferior pancreaticoduodenal artery	head of the pancreas and to the ascending and inferior parts of the duodenum (proximal loop)
intestinal arteries	branches to ileum, branches to jejunum (proximal loop)
ileocolic artery	supplies last part of ileum, cecum, and appendix (distal loop)
right colic artery	to ascending colon (distal loop)
middle colic artery	to the transverse colon (distal loop)

The number of arterial arcades in the ileum is more than the number of arcades in the jejunum.

The middle, right, and ileocecal branches anastomose with each other to form a marginal artery along the inner border of the colon. This artery is completed by branches of the left colic which is a branch of the inferior mesenteric artery.

== Clinical significance ==
- Compared to other vessels of similar size, the SMA is largely spared from the effects of atherosclerosis. This may be due to protective haemodynamic conditions.
- Acute occlusion of the SMA almost invariably leads to intestinal ischemia and often has devastating consequences, with up to 80% of SMA occlusions leading to death.
- The SMA can compress the left renal vein, leading to nutcracker syndrome; and/or the third (horizontal) part of the duodenum, leading to superior mesenteric artery syndrome.

== Additional images ==
Animated Volume rendered CT scan of abdominal and pelvic blood vessels.

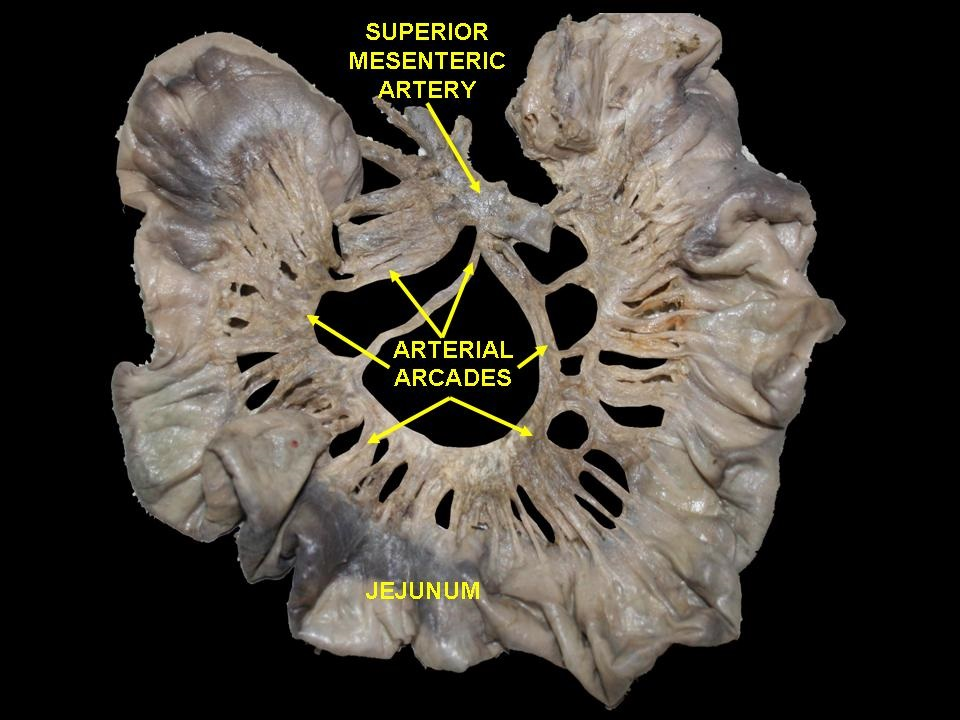
Superior mesenteric artery

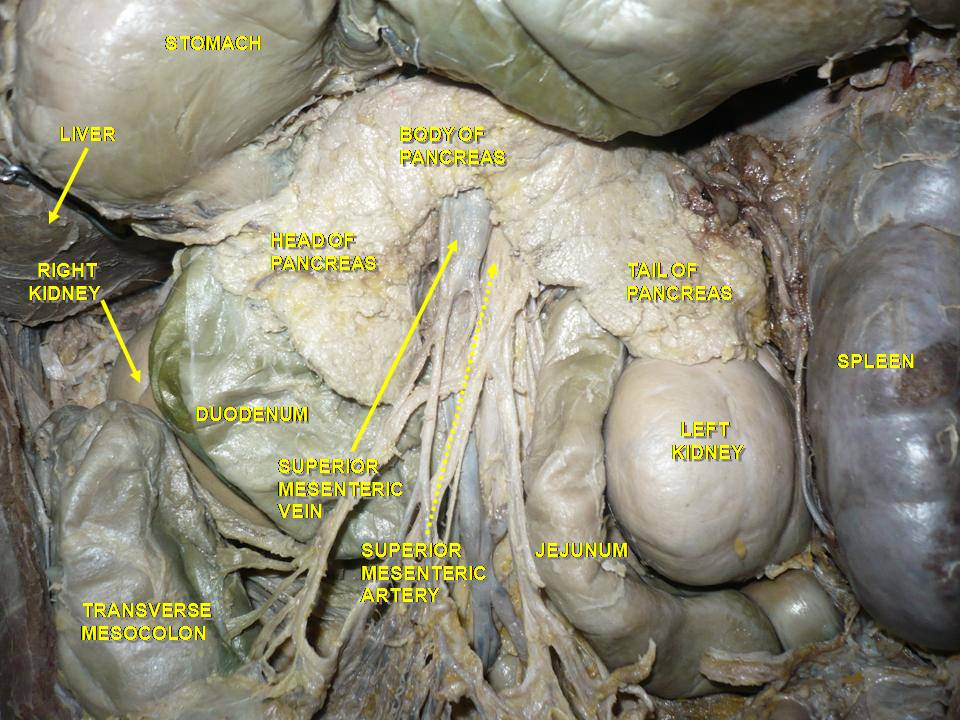
Dissection showing the anatomical relationship between the superior mesenteric artery and surrounding structures
