= Descending colon =

Part of the human colon

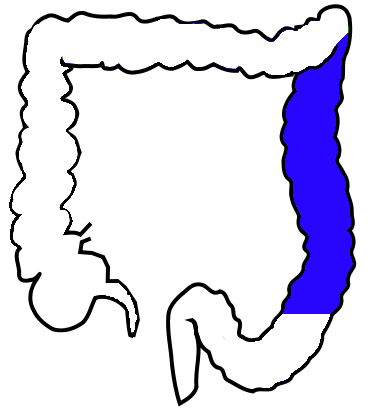
- Drawing of colon seen from front (descending colon coloured blue)

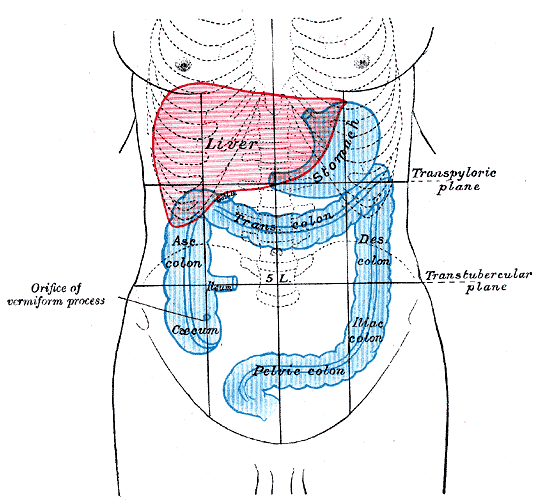
- Front of abdomen, showing surface markings for liver, stomach and great intestine (descending colon visible at center right, in blue)

Details
- Precursor: Hindgut
- System: Digestive system
- Artery: Left colic artery
- Vein: Left colic vein

Identifiers
- Latin: colon descendens
- MeSH: D044683
- TA98: A05.7.03.006
- TA2: 2986
- FMA: 14547

In the anatomy of humans and homologous primates, the descending colon is the part of the colon extending from the left colic flexure to the level of the iliac crest (whereupon it transitions into the sigmoid colon). The function of the descending colon in the digestive system is to store the remains of digested food that will be emptied into the rectum.

The descending colon is on the left side of the body (barring any malformations). The term left colon is hypernymous to descending colon in precise use; many casual mentions of the left colon chiefly concern the descending colon.

== Structure ==
Inner diameters of different sections of the large intestine, with descending/sigmoid colon (at right) measuring on average 6.3 cm (range 6.0-6.8 cm).

The descending colon extends from the left colic flexure at the upper left part of the abdomen inferior-ward through the left hypochondrium and lumbar regions, along the outer border of the left kidney, ending at the level of the iliac crest at the lower left part of the abdomen, being continued thenceforth as the sigmoid colon.

It is usually retroperitoneal (being lined by peritoneum on its anterior and lateral aspects), but may be suspended (usually short) mesentery in a minority of individuals.

The arterial supply comes via the left colic artery.

== Function ==
While the first part of the large intestine is responsible for the absorption of water and other substances from the chyme, the main function of the descending colon is to store waste until it can be removed from the body in solid form, when a person has a bowel movement. The stools gradually solidify as they move along into the descending colon.

== Clinical significance ==
There are several diseases associated with the descending colon. Among the most common are the inflammatory bowel diseases (such as ulcerative colitis or Crohn's disease) and colon cancer.

=== Ulcerative colitis ===
Ulcerative colitis can affect any part of the colon (and other mucosa, such as the mouth), but when it affects the descending colon, it is called left-sided colitis. Inflammation and ulcers on the lining of the intestine mark its presence. Symptoms of ulcerative colitis include diarrhea, bleeding, fever, abdominal pain, too much mucus in fecal material, and appetite and weight loss. Treatment methods can vary widely, ranging from changes in diet to drug therapy to corrective surgery, depending on the severity of the condition and the overall health of the patient.

=== Crohn's disease ===
When a person has Crohn's disease or Crohn's colitis, they have lesions on the tissues of the intestine; this makes it hard for the intestine to absorb water and salt. The symptoms which may develop from this disease include abdominal pain, diarrhea or constipation, nausea and vomiting, fever, blood in the stool, weight loss, abscesses and fatigue. There is no cure for Crohn's disease although many treatments are available. Symptomatic treatment with antidiarrhoeals is common in low level cases where the inflammation is reasonably under control. Steroid and/or sulphasalazine treatment are usually the first line of drug based management, although newer drugs along the TNF inhibitor line (such as infliximab and adalimumab) are becoming more widespread in the treatment of inflammatory colonic conditions. Diet and lifestyle changes can also be useful, as stress may exacerbate inflammatory processes.

=== Colon cancer ===
Cancer of the descending colon is a serious disease. A person can have colon cancer yet have no symptoms in the early stages. As such, regular colorectal examinations or fecal occult blood testing are necessary for catching the disease in its early stages. However, there are some signs that can indicate colon cancer; they include abrupt changes in bowel habits, bleeding from the rectum, black stools, frequent constipation, and mucus in the stools. Treatment options depend on the stage of the cancer and the overall health of the patient.

== See also ==
- Colonoscopy
- Ascending colon
