= Pancreaticoduodenal artery =

Pancreaticoduodenal artery (arteries to the pancreas and duodenum) can refer to:

- Superior pancreaticoduodenal artery
- Inferior pancreaticoduodenal artery

In case of a coarctation of the aorta located between the celiac trunk and the superior mesenteric artery, the anastomosis between these arteries can provide an alternative route for blood flow, called the pancreaticoduodenal arcade.
