= Mesenteric vessels =

Mesenteric vessels may refer to:

- Superior mesenteric vessels
  - Superior mesenteric artery
  - Superior mesenteric vein
- Inferior mesenteric vessels
  - Inferior mesenteric artery
  - Inferior mesenteric vein
