= Superior mesenteric vessels =

System of arteries and veins for the lower half of the human torso

The superior mesenteric vessels are composed of the superior mesenteric artery and the superior mesenteric vein.

In human anatomy, the superior mesenteric artery arises from the anterior surface of the abdominal aorta, just inferior to the origin of the celiac trunk, and supplies the intestine from the lower part of the duodenum through two-thirds of the transverse colon, as well as the pancreas. The superior mesenteric artery lies to the left of the similarly named vein, the superior mesenteric vein.

The superior mesenteric vein drains blood from the small intestine, large intestine, stomach, pancreas and appendix. At its termination behind the neck of the pancreas, the superior mesenteric vein combines with the splenic vein to form the hepatic portal vein.
