= Duodenal bulb =

Five-centimeter bulb below the stomach

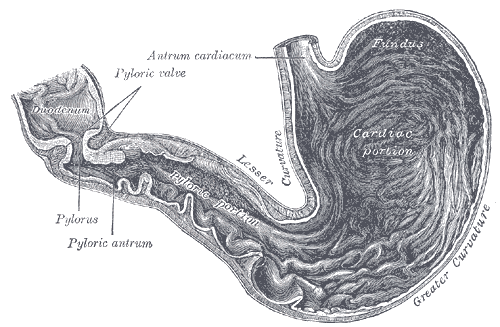
- Interior of the stomach. (There is no label for "Duodenal bulb", but the portion of the duodenum labeled at upper left is the duodenal bulb.)

Details

Identifiers
- Latin: ampulla duodeni, bulbus duodeni

The duodenal bulb (also ampulla of duodenum, duodenal ampulla, or duodenal cap) is the initial, dilated portion of (the superior part of) the duodenum just distal to the stomach; it begins at the pylorus and ends at the neck of the gallbladder. It is normally about 5 centimeters long.

== Structure ==
=== Relations ===
It is located posterior to the liver and the gallbladder and superior to the pancreatic head. The gastroduodenal artery, portal vein, and common bile duct are situated posterior to the duodenal bulb. The distal part of the bulb is located retroperitoneally. It is located immediately distal to the pyloric sphincter.

== Clinical significance ==
The duodenal bulb is the site of duodenal ulcer occurrence. Duodenal ulcers are more common than gastric ulcers and - unlike gastric ulcers - are caused by increased gastric acid secretion. Duodenal ulcers are commonly located anteriorly, and rarely posteriorly. Anterior ulcers can be complicated by perforation, while the posterior ones bleed. The reason for that is explained by their location. The peritoneal or abdominal cavity is located anterior to the duodenum. Therefore, if the ulcer grows deep enough, it will perforate, whereas if a posterior ulcer grows deep enough, it will penetrate the gastroduodenal artery and bleed.
