= Right gastric vein =

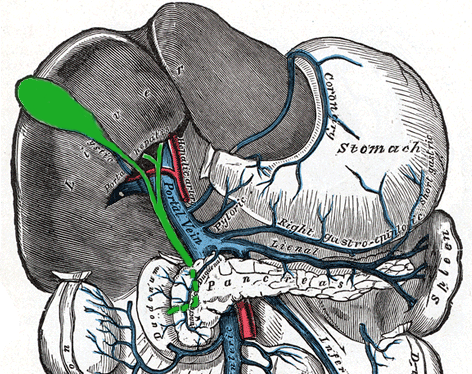
- The portal vein and its tributaries (right gastric vein visible but not labeled)

Details
- Drains from: Lesser curvature of the stomach
- Drains to: Hepatic portal vein
- Artery: Right gastric artery

Identifiers
- Latin: vena gastrica dextra
- TA98: A12.3.12.016
- TA2: 5111
- FMA: 15400

The right gastric vein (pyloric vein) drains blood from the lesser curvature of the stomach into the hepatic portal vein. It is part of the portal circulation.

== Structure ==
The right gastric vein passes right along the lesser curvature of the stomach to the pylorus. Once there, it joins onto the portal vein before the duodenum. The prepyloric vein is the last connecting branch onto the right gastric vein, marking the end of the stomach, and draining the proximal part of the duodenum.

== Function ==
The right gastric vein drains deoxygenated blood from the lesser curvature of the stomach.

== See also ==
- Left gastric vein
