= Duodenum =

First section of the small intestine

- Image of the human gastrointestinal tract, with the duodenum highlighted.

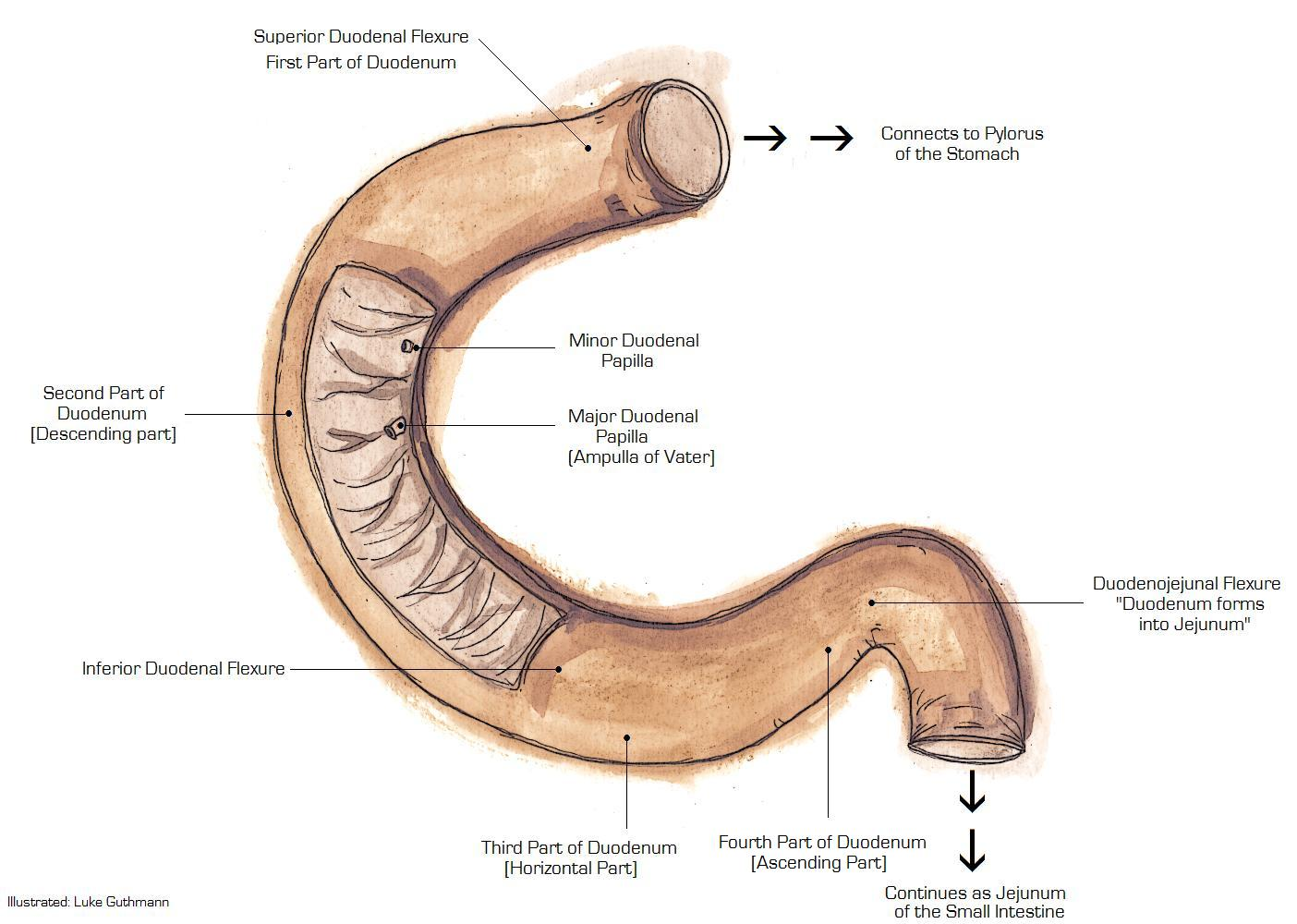
- Diagram of the human duodenum with major parts labelled

Details
- Pronunciation: /ˌdjuːəˈdiːnəm/, US also /djuˈɒdɪnəm/
- Precursor: Foregut (1st and 2nd parts), midgut (3rd and 4th part)
- Part of: Small intestine
- System: Digestive system
- Artery: Inferior pancreaticoduodenal artery, superior pancreaticoduodenal artery
- Vein: Pancreaticoduodenal veins
- Nerve: Celiac ganglia, vagus

Identifiers
- Latin: duodenum
- MeSH: D004386
- TA98: A05.6.02.001
- TA2: 2944
- FMA: 7206

The duodenum is the first section of the small intestine in most vertebrates, including mammals, reptiles, and birds. In mammals, it may be the principal site for iron absorption. The duodenum precedes the jejunum and ileum and is the shortest part of the small intestine.

In humans, the duodenum is a hollow jointed tube about 25–38 centimetres (10–15 inches) long connecting the stomach to the jejunum, the middle part of the small intestine. It begins with the duodenal bulb, and ends at the duodenojejunal flexure marked by the suspensory muscle of duodenum. The duodenum can be divided into four parts: the first (superior), the second (descending), the third (transverse) and the fourth (ascending) parts.

== Overview ==
The duodenum is the first section of the small intestine in most higher vertebrates, including mammals, reptiles, and birds. In fish, the divisions of the small intestine are not as clear, and the terms anterior intestine or proximal intestine may be used instead of duodenum. In mammals the duodenum may be the principal site for iron absorption.

In humans, the duodenum is a C-shaped hollow jointed tube, 25–38 centimetres (10–15 inches) in length, lying adjacent to the stomach (and connecting it to the small intestine). It is divided anatomically into four sections. The first part lies within the peritoneum but its other parts are retroperitoneal.

=== Parts ===
The first or superior part of the duodenum is a continuation from the pylorus to the transpyloric plane. It is superior (above) to the rest of the segments, at the vertebral level of L1. The duodenal bulb, about 2 cm (3/4 in) long, is the first part of the duodenum and is slightly dilated. The duodenal bulb is a remnant of the mesoduodenum, a mesentery that suspends the organ from the posterior abdominal wall in fetal life. The first part of the duodenum is mobile, and connected to the liver by the hepatoduodenal ligament of the lesser omentum. The first part of the duodenum ends at the corner, the superior duodenal flexure.

Relations:

- Anterior
  - Gallbladder
  - Quadrate lobe of liver
- Posterior
  - Bile duct
  - Gastroduodenal artery
  - Portal vein
  - Inferior vena cava
  - Head of pancreas
- Superior
  - Neck of gallbladder
  - Hepatoduodenal ligament (lesser omentum)
- Inferior
  - Neck of pancreas
  - Greater omentum
  - Head of pancreas

The second or descending part of the duodenum begins at the superior duodenal flexure. It goes inferior to the lower border of vertebral body L3, before making a sharp turn medially into the inferior duodenal flexure, the end of the descending part.

The pancreatic duct and common bile duct enter the descending duodenum, through the major duodenal papilla. The second part of the duodenum also contains the minor duodenal papilla, the entrance for the accessory pancreatic duct. The junction between the embryological foregut and midgut lies just below the major duodenal papilla.

The third, horizontal or inferior part of the duodenum is 10~12 cm in length. It begins at the inferior duodenal flexure and passes transversely to the left, passing in front of the inferior vena cava, abdominal aorta and the vertebral column. The superior mesenteric artery and vein are anterior to the third part of the duodenum. This part may be compressed between the aorta and SMA causing superior mesenteric artery syndrome.

The fourth or ascending part of the duodenum passes upward, joining with the jejunum at the duodenojejunal flexure. The fourth part of the duodenum is at the vertebral level L3, and may pass directly on top, or slightly to the left, of the aorta.

=== Blood supply ===
The first (superior) part of the duodenum, right after the pylorus of the stomach, is not supplied by the arcades. Instead, it is supplied by the supraduodenal artery and posterior superior pancreaticoduodenal artery, along with some branches of the right gastroepiploic artery and the anterior superior pancreaticoduodenal artery. In many people part of the first centimeter of the duodenum is also supplied by branches of the right gastric artery.

The remaining three parts (descending, horizontal, and ascending) of the duodenum are supplied by two arcades (rings) of arteries, one anterior (in front) of the duodenum and pancreas and one posterior to (behind) them. Each arcade is made of two anastomosed (connected) arteries. The superior artery of each arcade comes from the superior pancreaticoduodenal artery, which arises from the celiac artery via the gastroduodenal artery. The inferior artery of each arcade comes from the inferior pancreaticoduodenal artery, a branch of the superior mesenteric artery. The anterior arcade is formed by the anterior superior pancreaticoduodenal artery and the anterior inferior pancreaticoduodenal artery; the posterior arcade is formed by the posterior superior pancreaticoduodenal artery and the posterior inferior pancreaticoduodenal artery.

Vessels from the arcades supply the muscularis externa (muscular layer) before forming a plexus (network of blood vessels) in the submucosa (a layer of connective tissue) called the submucosal plexus. Vessels continue from the submucosal plexus through the muscularis mucosae (another thin muscular layer) before forming another plexus under the epithelium of the villi, the layer where nutrients are absorbed. These vessels entering the duodenum from the arcades are sometimes called vasae rectae or arteriae rectae.

The venous drainage of the duodenum mainly follows the arteries, ultimately draining into the portal system. The venous arcades are usually superficial to the arterial arcades. The anterior superior pancreaticoduodenal vein drains into the right gastroepiploic vein, as do the veins of the lower first part of the duodenum and the pylorus (subpyloric veins). The upper first part of the duodenum is drained by suprapyloric veins, which can drain into the portal vein or the posterior superior pancreaticoduodenal vein, which drains into the portal vein. The inferior veins of the arcades drain into the superior mesenteric, inferior mesenteric, splenic, or first jejunal vein.

Embryologically, the duodenum arises from both the foregut and midgut, constituting the boundary between the two. However, the "midgut" is defined surgically as the parts of the intestine supplied by the superior mesenteric artery. Since the duodenum is supplied both by the celiac artery and the superior mesenteric artery, these two definitions are similar but not exactly the same.

=== Lymphatic drainage ===
The lymphatic vessels follow the arteries in a retrograde fashion. The anterior lymphatic vessels drain into the pancreatoduodenal lymph nodes located along the superior and inferior pancreatoduodenal arteries and then into the pyloric lymph nodes (along the gastroduodenal artery). The posterior lymphatic vessels pass posterior to the head of the pancreas and drain into the superior mesenteric lymph nodes. Efferent lymphatic vessels from the duodenal lymph nodes ultimately pass into the celiac lymph nodes.

=== Histology ===
Under microscopy, the duodenum has a villous mucosa. This is distinct from the mucosa of the pylorus, which directly joins the duodenum. Like other structures of the gastrointestinal tract, the duodenum has a mucosa, submucosa, muscularis externa, and adventitia. Glands line the duodenum, known as Brunner's glands, which secrete mucus and bicarbonate in order to neutralise stomach acids. These are distinct glands not found in the ileum or jejunum, the other parts of the small intestine.

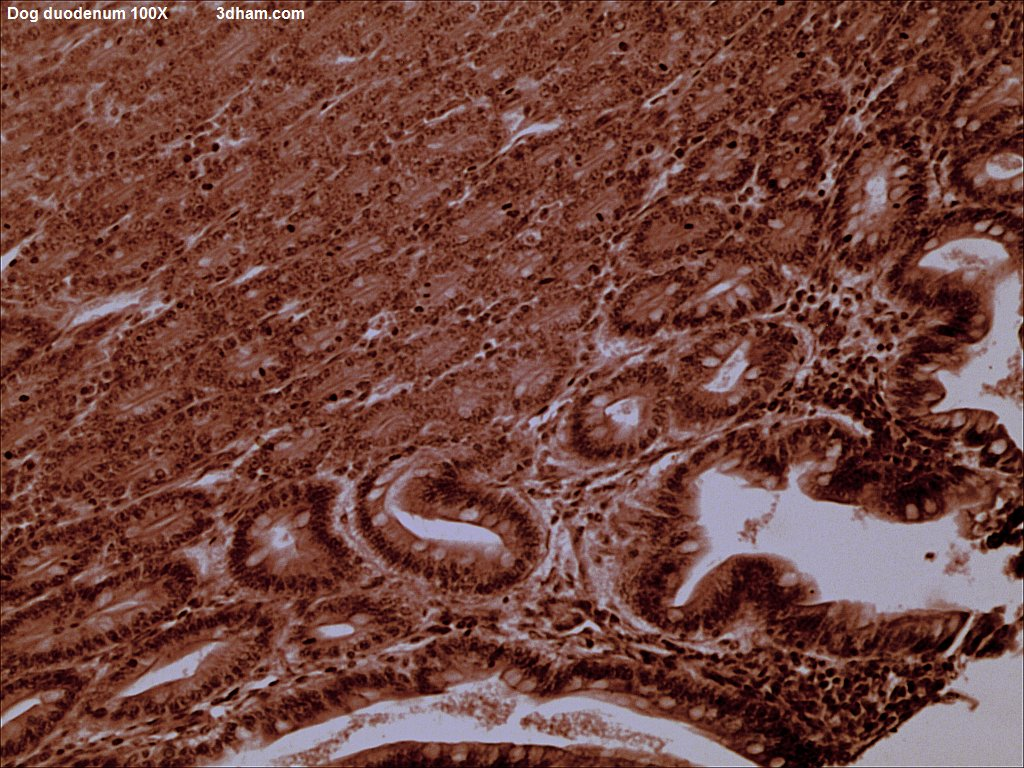
Dog duodenum 100X

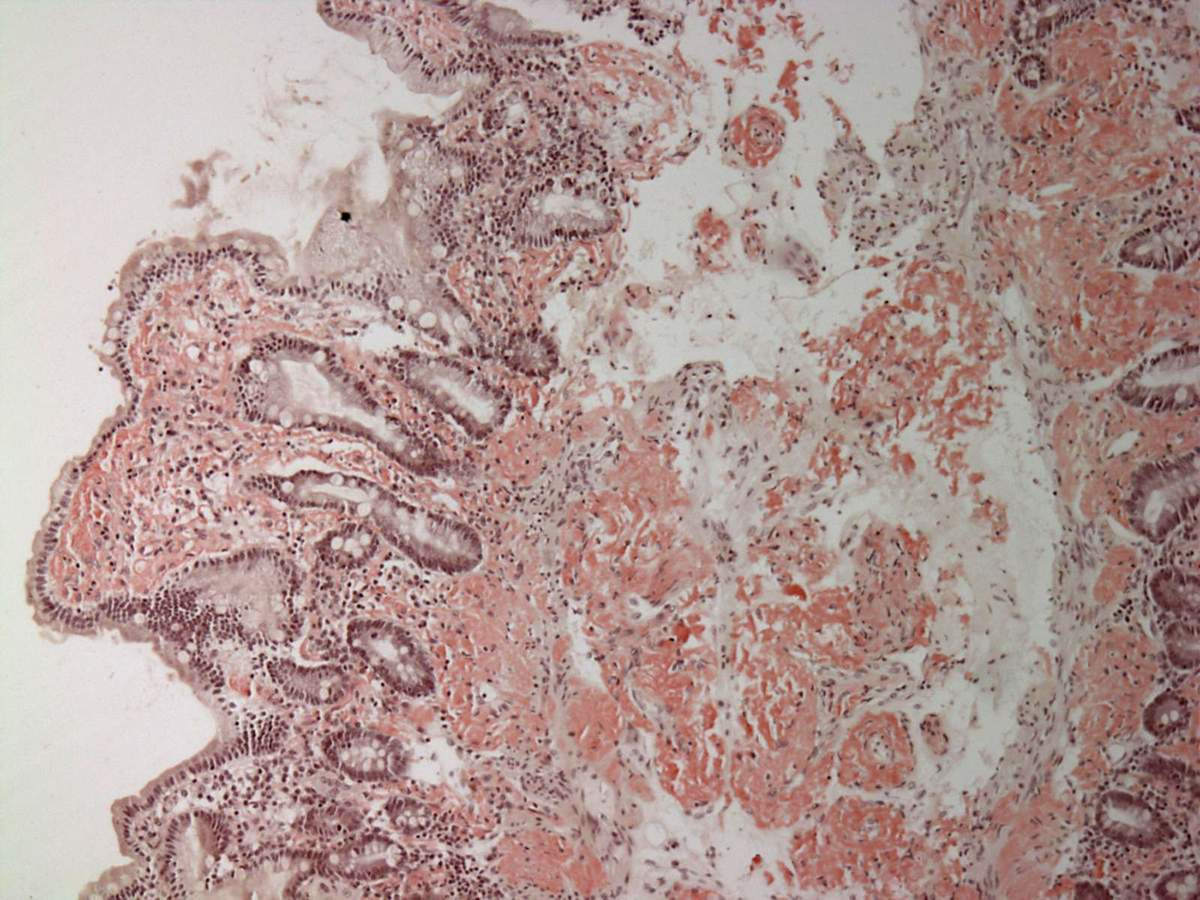
Duodenum with amyloid deposition in lamina propria

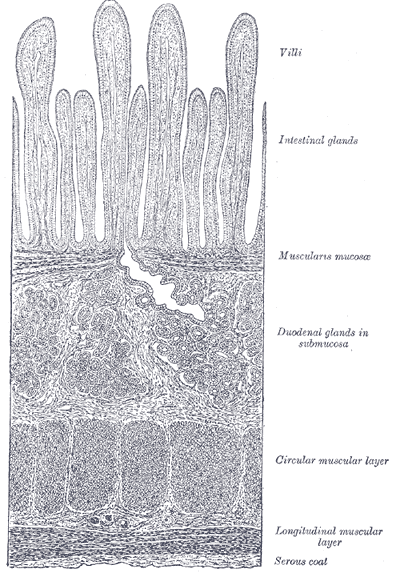
Section of duodenum of cat. X 60

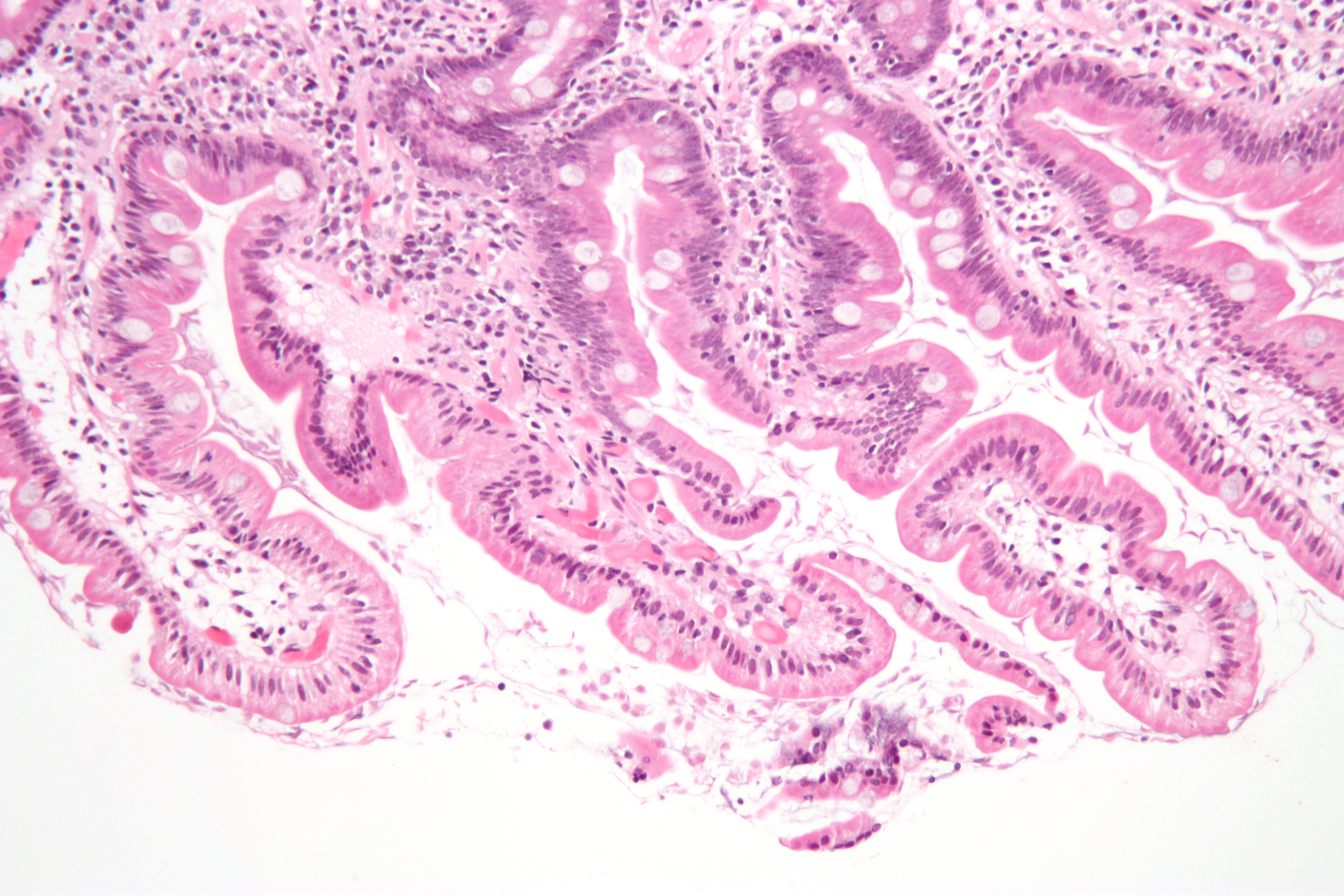
Micrograph showing giardiasis on a duodenal biopsy (H&E stain)

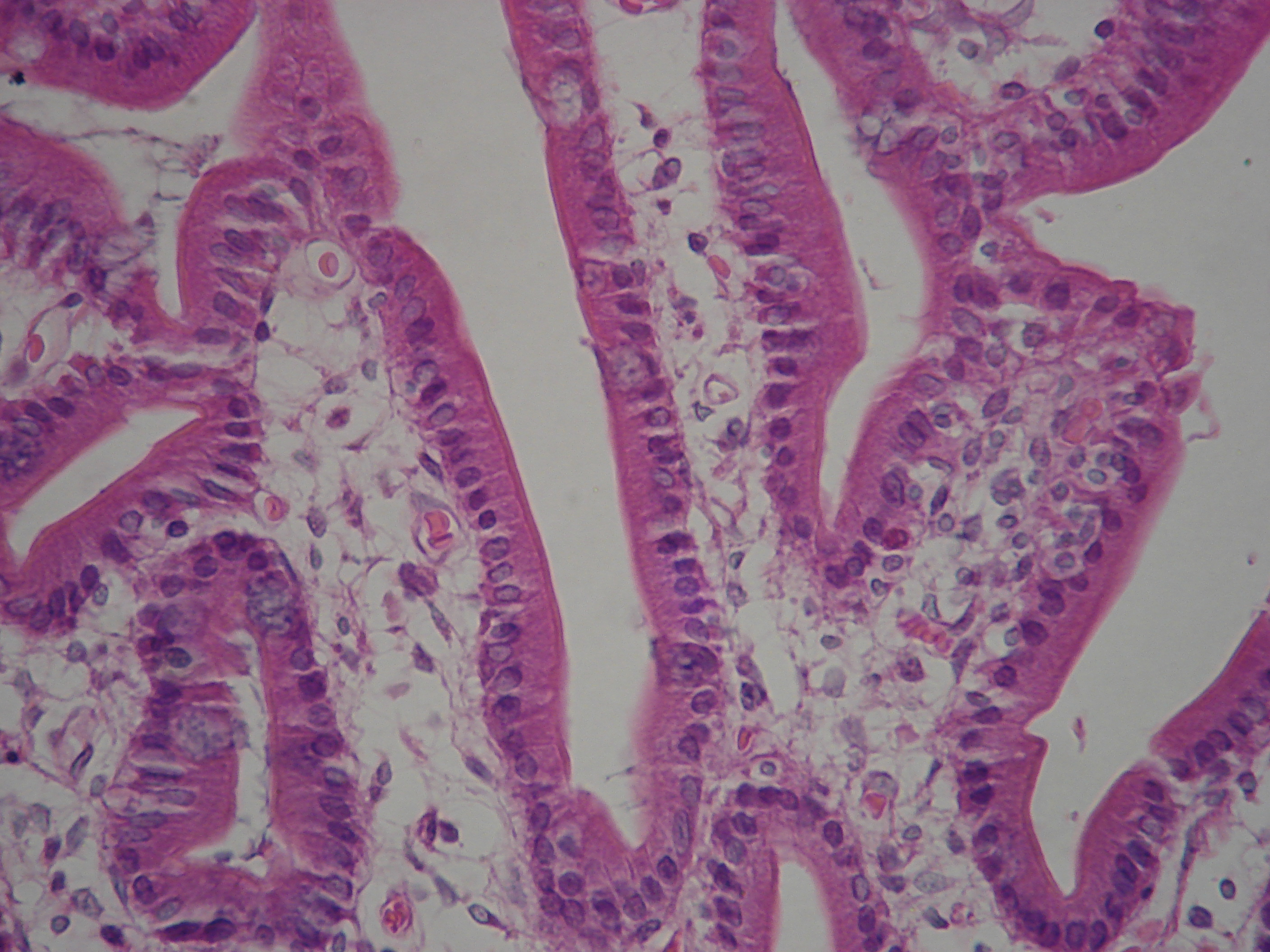
Duodenum with brush border (microvillus)

=== Variation ===
The duodenum's close anatomical association with the pancreas creates differences in function based on the position and orientation of the organs. The congenital abnormality, annular pancreas, causes a portion of the pancreas to encircle the duodenum. In an extramural annular pancreas, the pancreatic duct encircles the duodenum which results in gastrointestinal obstruction. An intramural annular pancreas is characterized by pancreatic tissue that is fused with the duodenal wall, causing duodenal ulceration.

=== Gene and protein expression ===
About 20,000 protein coding genes are expressed in human cells and 70% of these genes are expressed in the normal duodenum. Some 300 of these genes are more specifically expressed in the duodenum with very few genes expressed only in the duodenum. The corresponding specific proteins are expressed in the duodenal mucosa, and many of these are also expressed in the small intestine, such as alanine aminopeptidase, a digestive enzyme, angiotensin-converting enzyme, involved in controlling blood pressure, and RBP2, a protein involved in the uptake of vitamin A.

== Function ==
The duodenum is largely responsible for the breakdown of food in the small intestine, using enzymes. The duodenum also regulates the rate of emptying of the stomach via hormonal pathways. Secretin and cholecystokinin are released from cells in the duodenal epithelium in response to acidic and fatty stimuli present there when the pylorus opens and emits gastric chyme into the duodenum for further digestion. These cause the liver and gallbladder to release bile, and the pancreas to release bicarbonate and digestive enzymes such as trypsin, lipase and amylase into the duodenum as they are needed.

The duodenum is a critical contributor to the regulation of food intake and glycemic control. As the first part of the small intestine, the duodenum is the initial site of nutrient absorption in the gastrointestinal tract. The duodenum senses nutrient intake and composition, and signals to the liver, pancreas, adipose tissue and brain through the direct and indirect release of several key hormones and signaling molecules, including the incretin peptides glucose-dependent insulinotropic polypeptide (GIP) and glucagon-like peptide-1 (GLP-1), as well as cholecystokinin (CCK) and secretin. The duodenum also signals to the brain directly via vagal afferents enabling neural control over food intake and glycemia. Intestinal secretion of GIP and GLP-1 stimulates glucose-dependent insulin secretion from pancreatic beta-cells, known as the incretin effect. Incretin peptides, principally GLP-1 and GIP, regulate islet hormone secretion, glucose concentrations, lipid metabolism, gut motility, appetite and body weight, and immune function.

The villi of the duodenum have a leafy-looking appearance, which is a histologically identifiable structure. Brunner's glands, which secrete mucus, are only found in the duodenum. The duodenum wall consists of a very thin layer of cells that form the muscularis mucosae.

== Clinical significance ==
=== Ulceration ===
Ulcers of the duodenum commonly occur because of infection by the bacteria Helicobacter pylori. These bacteria, through a number of mechanisms, erode the protective mucosa of the duodenum, predisposing it to damage from gastric acids. The first part of the duodenum is the most common location of ulcers since it is where the acidic chyme meets the duodenal mucosa before mixing with the alkaline secretions of the duodenum. Duodenal ulcers may cause recurrent abdominal pain and dyspepsia, and are often investigated using a urea breath test to test for the bacteria, and endoscopy to confirm ulceration and take a biopsy. If treated, these are often managed through antibiotics that aim to eradicate the bacteria, and proton-pump inhibitors and antacids to reduce the gastric acidity.

=== Celiac disease ===
The British Society of Gastroenterology guidelines specify that a duodenal biopsy is required for the diagnosis of adult celiac disease. The biopsy is ideally performed at a moment when the patient is on a gluten-containing diet.

=== Cancer ===
Duodenal cancer is a cancer in the first section of the small intestine. Cancer of the duodenum is relatively rare compared to stomach cancer and colorectal cancer; malignant tumors in the duodenum constitute only around 0.3% of all the gastrointestinal tract tumors but around half of cancerous tissues that develop in the small intestine. Its histology is often observed to be adenocarcinoma, meaning that the cancerous tissue arises from glandular cells in the epithelial tissue lining the duodenum.

=== Obesity and diabetes ===
A western diet induces duodenal mucosal hyperplasia and duodenal dysfunction that underlie insulin resistance, type 2 diabetes and obesity. Diet-induced duodenal mucosal hyperplasia consists of increased mucosal mass, increased villus length, decreased crypt density, proliferation of enteroendocrine cells, increased enterocyte mass, and an accumulation of lipid droplets in the mucosa. Diet induced duodenal dysfunction includes increased duodenal nutrient absorption, altered duodenal hormone secretion, and altered intestinal vagal afferent neuronal function.

=== Inflammation ===
Inflammation of the duodenum is referred to as duodenitis. There are multiple known causes. Celiac disease and inflammatory bowel disease are two of the known causes.

== Etymology ==
The name duodenum is Medieval Latin, short for intestīnum duodēnum digitōrum, meaning "intestine of twelve finger-widths (in length)", genitive of duodēnī, "twelve each", (related to duodecim "twelve"). Coined by Gerard of Cremona (d. 1187) in his Latin translation of "Canon Avicennae", "اثنا عشر" itself a loan-translation of Greek dodekadaktylon (δωδεκαδάκτυλον), literally "twelve fingers long". The intestine part was so called by the Greek physician Herophilus (c. 335–280 BCE) for its length, about equal to the breadth of 12 fingers.

Many languages use calques for this word. For example, German Zwölffingerdarm, Dutch Twaalfvingerige darm, Turkish Oniki parmak bağırsağı, and Mandarin Chinese 十二指肠 shí'èr zhǐ cháng.

== Additional images ==
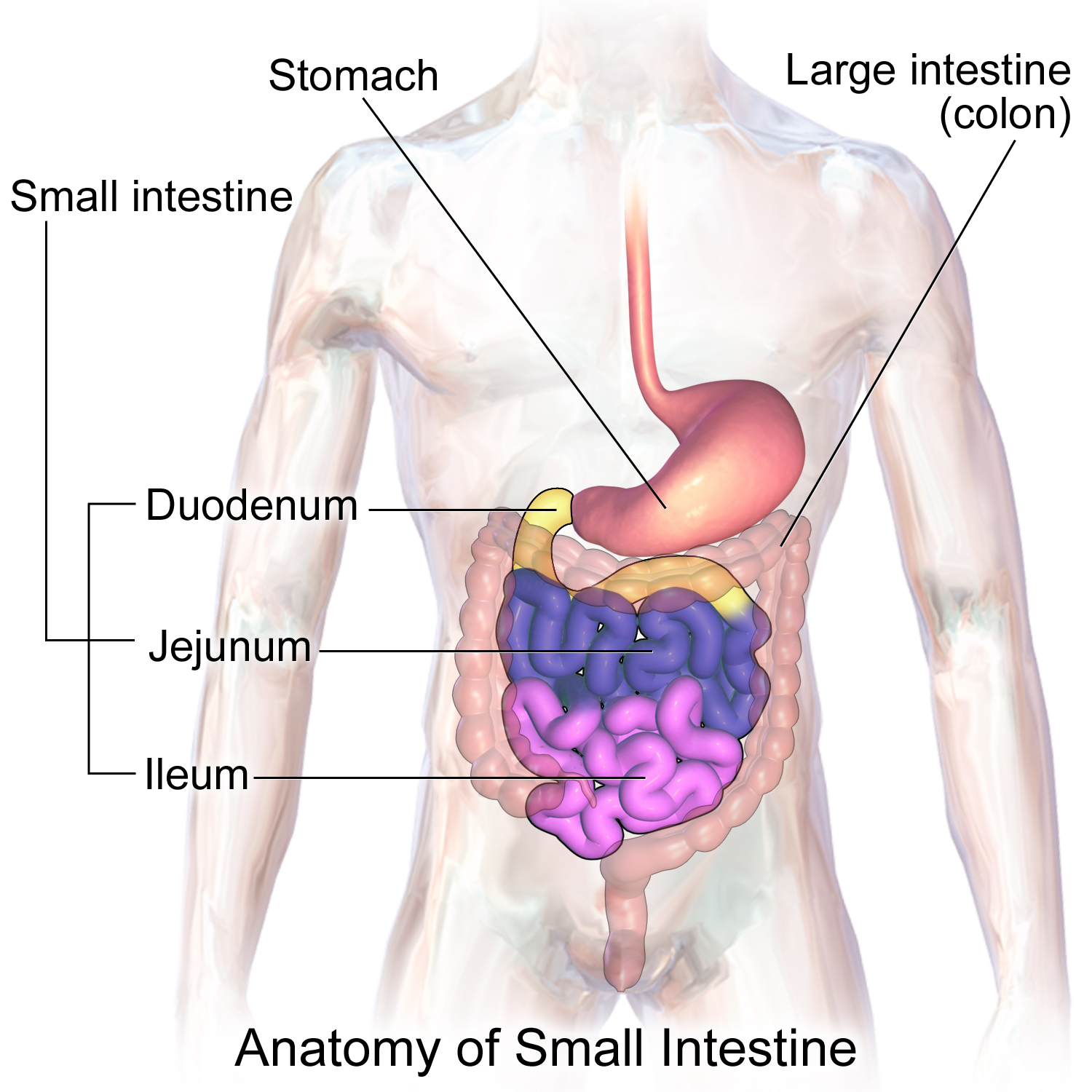
Sections of the small intestine

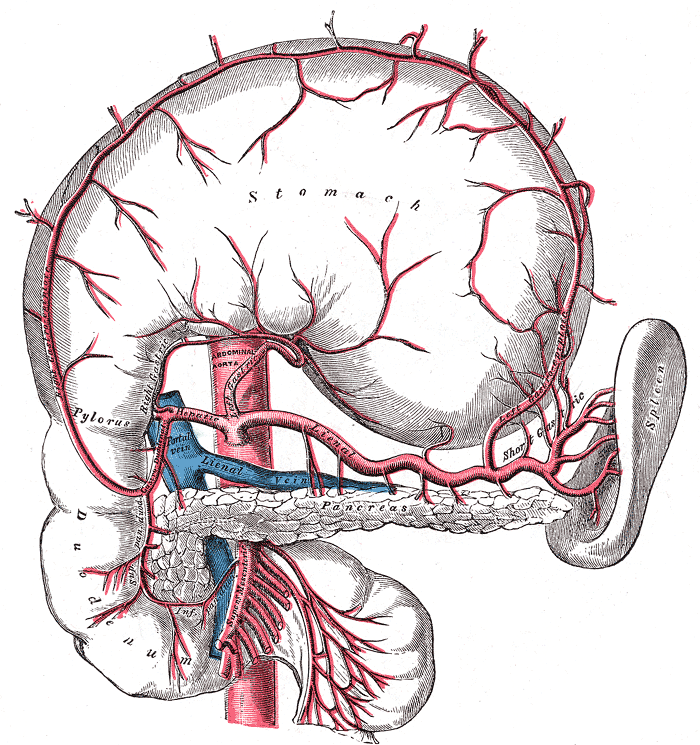
The celiac artery and its branches; the stomach has been raised and the peritoneum removed

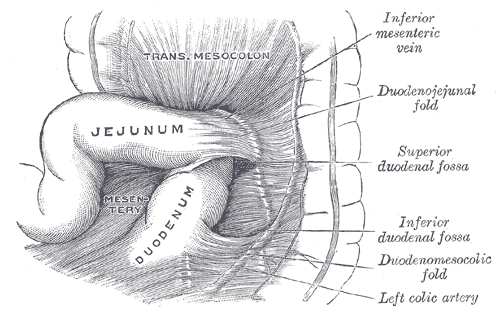
Superior and inferior duodenal fossæ

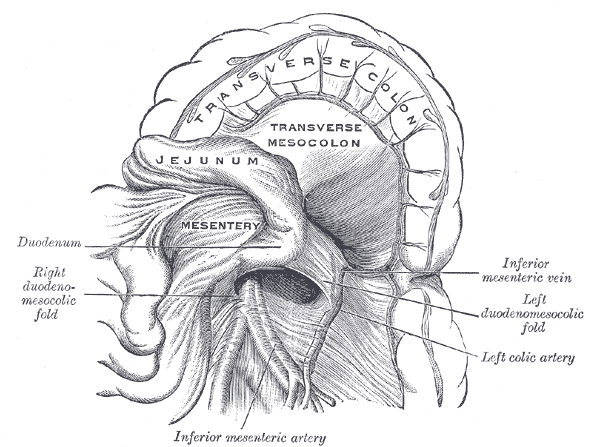
Duodenojejunal fossa

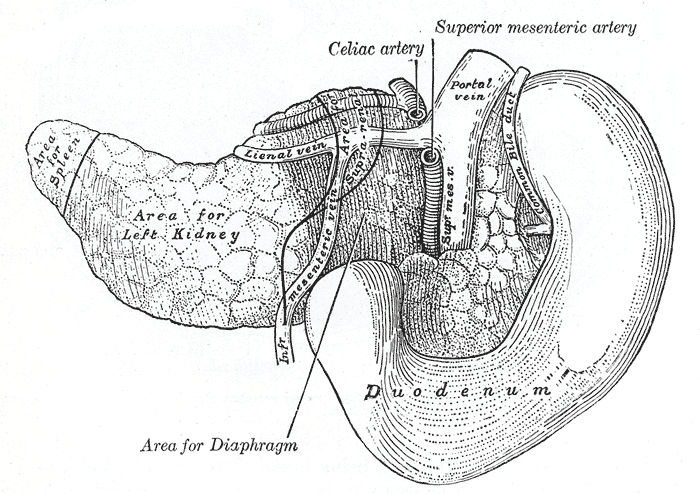
The pancreas and duodenum from behind

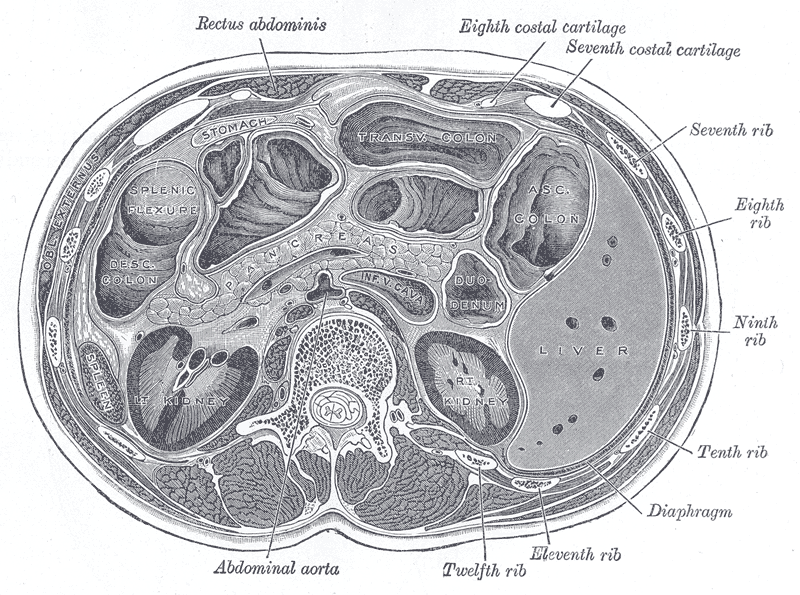
Transverse section through the middle of the first lumbar vertebra, showing the relations of the pancreas

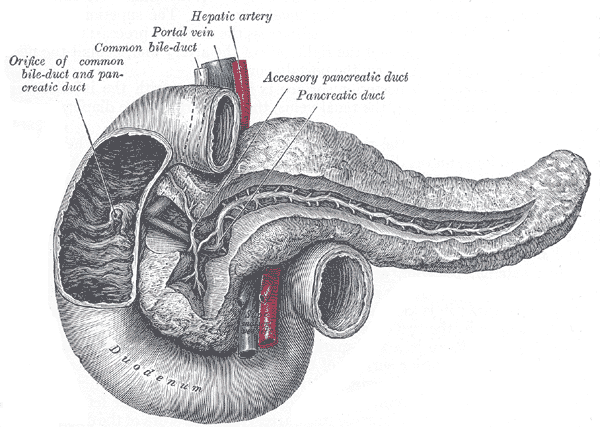
The pancreatic duct

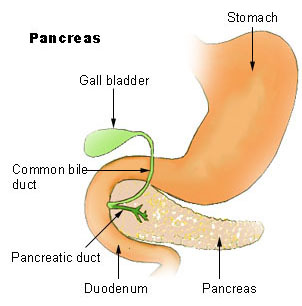
Region of pancreas

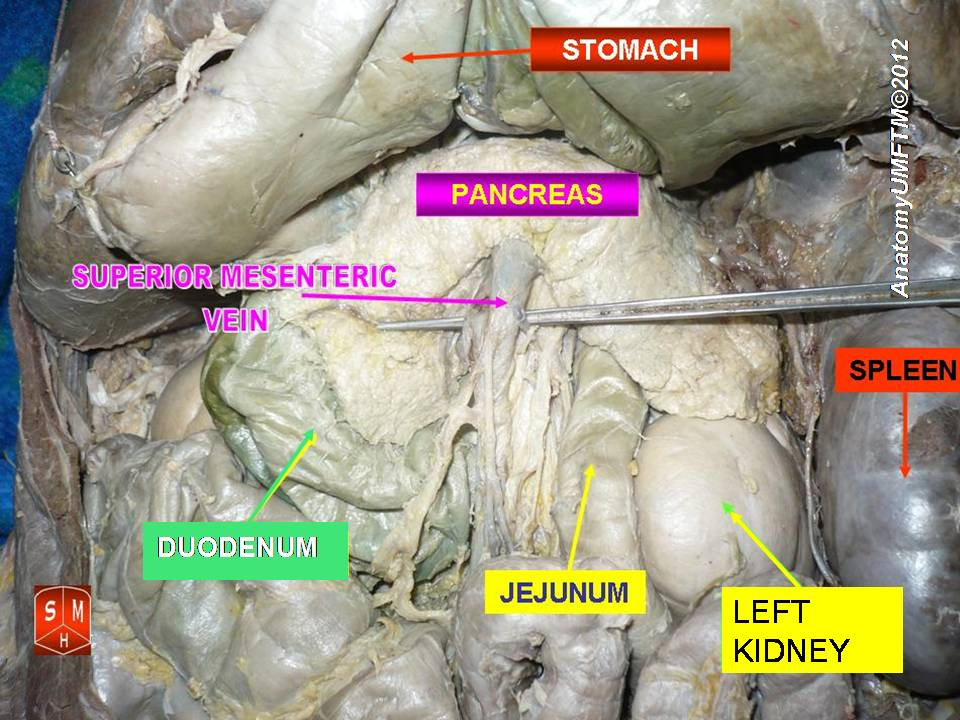
Duodenum

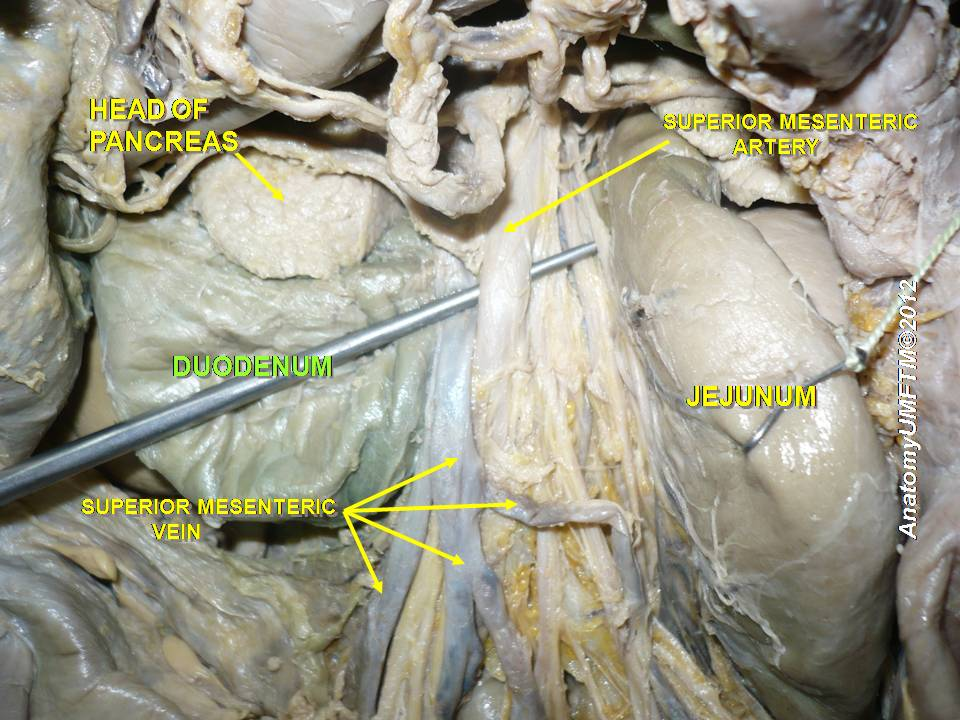
Duodenum

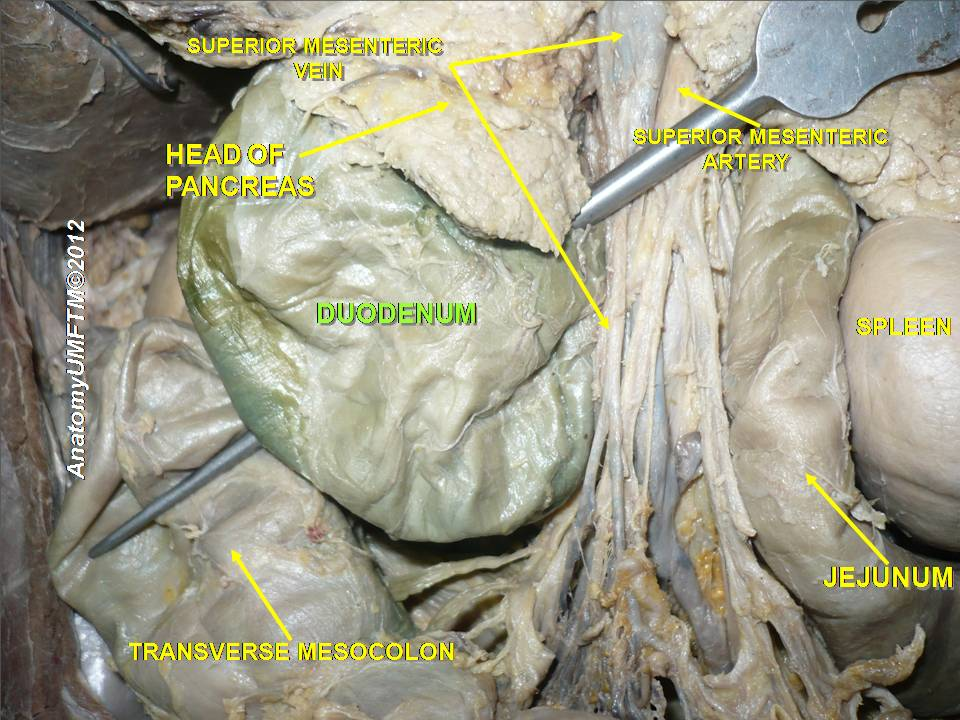
Duodenum

== See also ==
- Pancreas
- Choledochoduodenostomy - a surgical procedure to create a connection between the common bile duct (CBD) and an alternative portion of the duodenum.
