= Portal vein thrombosis =

Formation of a blood clot in the hepatic portal vein, reducing blood to the liver

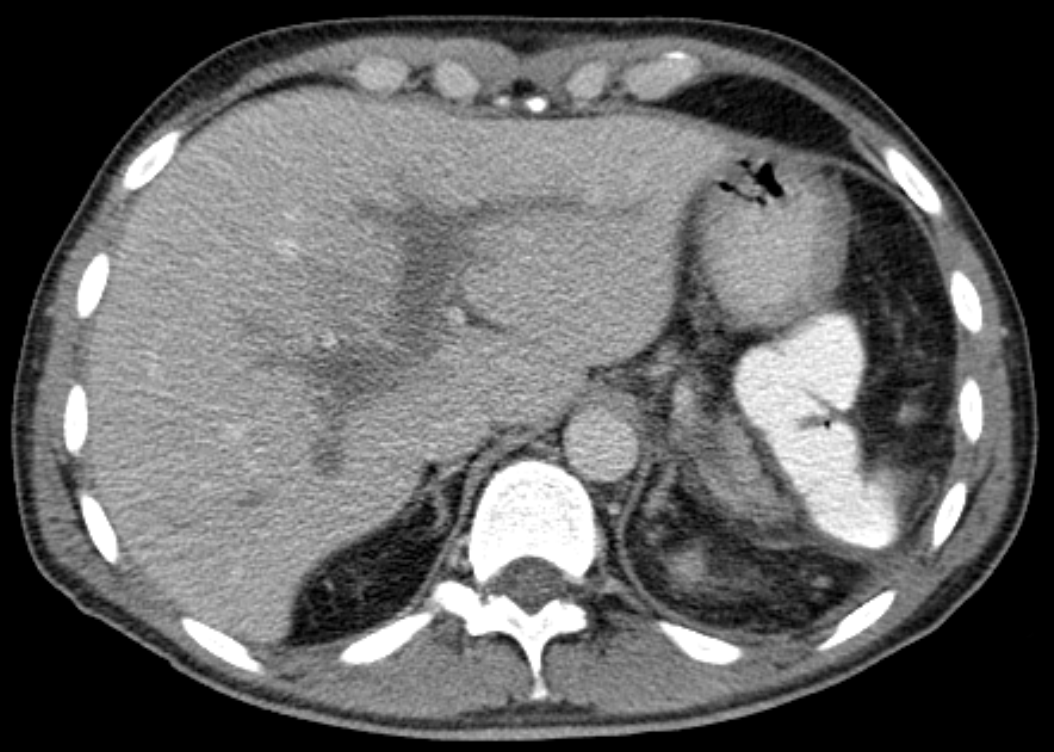
- Portal vein thrombosis seen with computed tomography.
- Specialty: Angiology

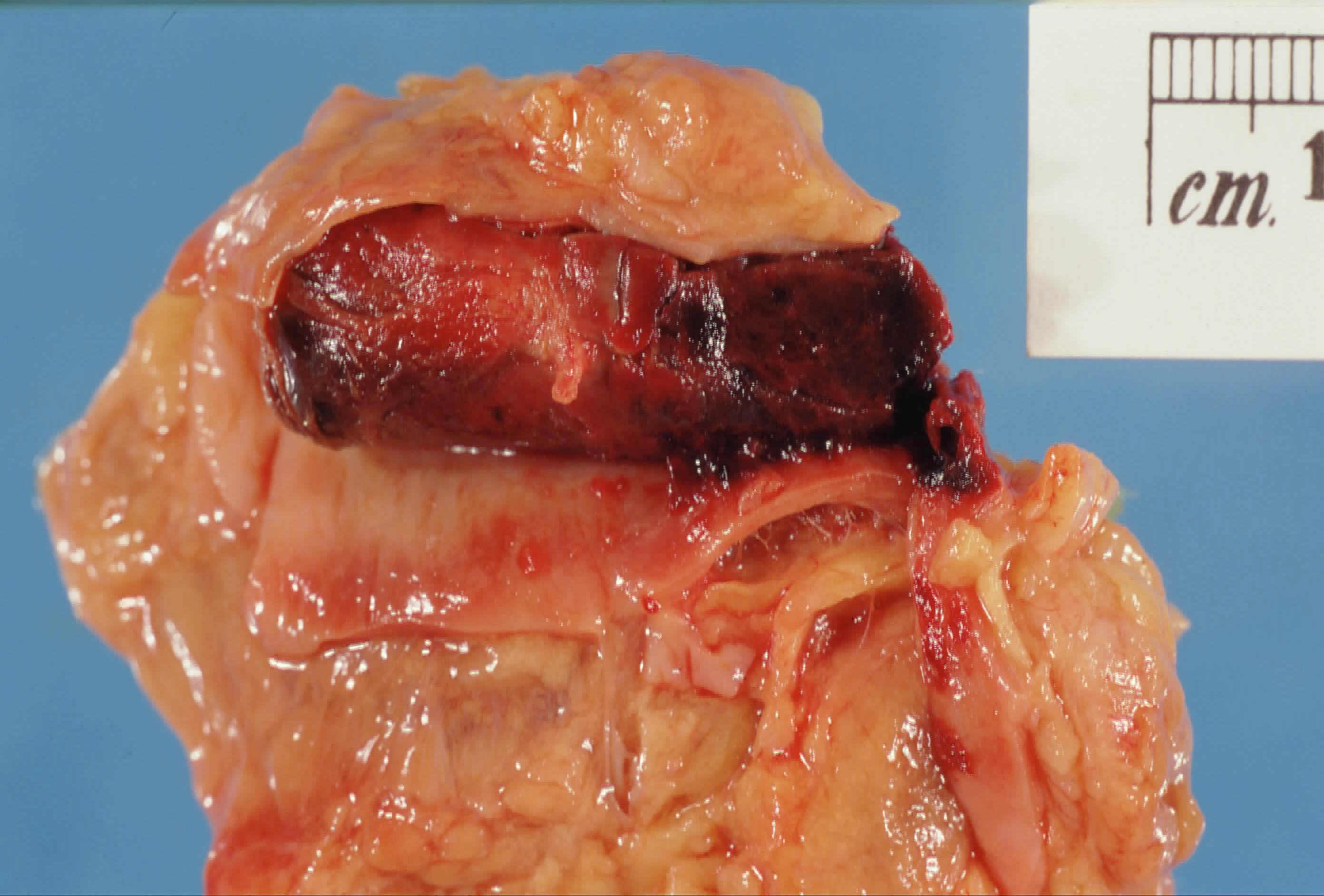
Portal vein thrombosis, incidental PM finding.

Portal vein thrombosis (PVT) is a vascular disease of the liver that occurs when a blood clot occurs in the hepatic portal vein, which can lead to increased pressure in the portal vein system and reduced blood supply to the liver. The mortality rate is approximately 1 in 10.

An equivalent clot in the vasculature that exits the liver carrying deoxygenated blood to the right atrium via the inferior vena cava, is known as hepatic vein thrombosis or Budd-Chiari syndrome.

== Signs and symptoms ==
Portal vein thrombosis causes upper abdominal pain, possibly accompanied by nausea and an enlarged liver and/or spleen; the abdomen may be filled with fluid (ascites). A persistent fever may result from the generalized inflammation. While abdominal pain may come and go if the thrombus forms suddenly, long-standing clot build-up can also develop without causing symptoms, leading to portal hypertension before it is diagnosed.

Other symptoms can develop based on the cause. For example, if portal vein thrombosis develops due to liver cirrhosis, bleeding or other signs of liver disease may be present. If portal vein thrombosis develops due to pylephlebitis, signs of infection such as fever, chills, or night sweats may be present.

== Causes ==
Slowed blood flow due to underlying cirrhosis or congestive heart failure is often implicated. The prevalence of PVT in patients with cirrhosis is unclear, with a wide variety of incidence claimed by various researchers (estimated to be 1 in 100 by some while others believe it affects nearly 1 in 4).

Thrombophilia (including inherited conditions such as factor V Leiden deficiency, protein C or S deficiency, or antiphospholipid antibody syndrome) is another common cause. Nearly one-third of patients have a myeloproliferative disorder (e.g. polycythemia vera or primary thrombocytosis), most commonly due to a Janus kinase 2 (JAK2) gene mutation. Oral contraceptive use or pregnancy are other non-inherited tendencies for thrombosis.

Alternatively, the portal vein may be injured as a result of pancreatitis, diverticulitis, cholangiocarcinoma, hepatocellular carcinoma (HCC), or abdominal surgery/trauma. Red flags for cancerous growth as a cause are elevated alpha fetoprotein levels, portal vein diameter greater than 2.3 cm, pulsatility on Doppler ultrasound imaging, or hyperintense hepatic arterial phase (HAP) on CT scan with contrast.

PVT is also a known complication of surgical removal of the spleen. During the last several years, myeloproliferative neoplasms (MPNs) have emerged as a leading systemic cause of splanchnic vein thromboses (which include PVT).

== Mechanism ==
The main portal vein is formed by the union of the splenic vein and superior mesenteric vein (SMV). It is responsible for approximately three-quarters of the liver's blood flow, transported from much of the gastrointestinal system as well as the pancreas, gallbladder, and spleen. Cirrhosis alters bleeding pathways, thus patients are simultaneously at risk of uncontrolled bleeding and forming clots. A long-standing hindrance in flow, as in chronic PVT, also known as portal cavernoma, can cause an increase in the hepatic venous pressure gradient (portal hypertension) and increased blood flow through subsidiary veins. This may lead to ascites or bleeding from varices.

An infected thrombus may become septic, known as pylephlebitis; if blood cultures are positive for growth at this time, the most common organism is Bacteroides.

== Diagnosis ==
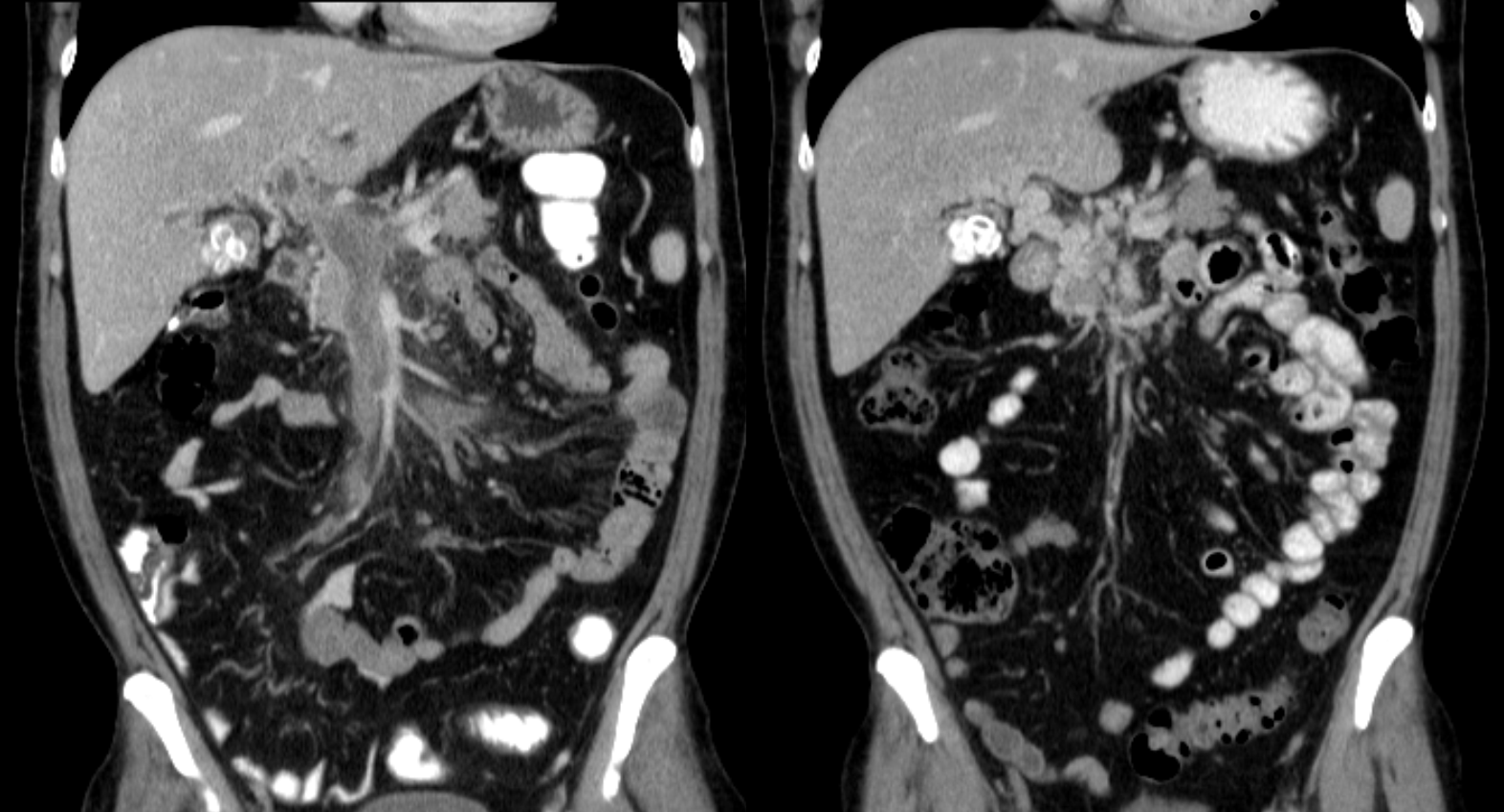
Portal vein thrombosis on computed tomography (left) and cavernous transformation of the portal vein after 1 year (right)

The diagnosis of portal vein thrombosis is usually made with imaging confirming a clot in the portal vein; ultrasound is the least invasive method and the addition of the Doppler technique shows a filling defect in blood flow. PVT may be classified as either occlusive or nonocclusive based on evidence of blood flow around the clot. An alternative characterization based on site can be made: Type 1 is limited to the main portal vein, Type 2 involves only a portal vein branch (2a, or 2b if both branches are affected), and Type 3 if clot is found throughout both areas. Determination of condition severity may be derived via computed tomography (CT) with contrast, magnetic resonance imaging (MRI), or MR angiography (MRA). Those with chronic PVT may undergo upper endoscopy (esophagogastroduodenoscopy, EGD) to evaluate the presence of concurrent dilated veins (varices) in the stomach or esophagus. Other than perhaps slightly elevated transaminases, laboratory tests to evaluate liver function are typically normal. D-dimer levels in the blood may be elevated as a result of fibrin breakdown.

On duplex ultrasound, demonstration of echogenic material within the portal vein, complete or partial absence of colour flow in the portal vein, presence of collateral vessels around the portal vein or gall bladder that bypass the portal vein.

Portal vein thrombosis grading after Yerdel et al.

== Treatment ==
Treatment is aimed at opening the blocked veins to minimize complications; the duration of the clot (acute versus chronic) affects treatment. Unless there are underlying reasons why it would be harmful, anticoagulation (low molecular weight heparin, followed by warfarin) is often initiated and maintained in patients who do not have cirrhosis. Anticoagulation for patients with cirrhosis who experience portal vein thrombosis is usually not advised unless they have chronic PVT 1) with thrombophilia, 2) with clot burden in the mesenteric veins, or 3) inadequate blood supply to the bowels. In more severe instances, shunts or a liver transplant may be considered. If blood flow to the gastrointestinal tract has been compromised chronically, surgery may be required to remove the dead intestine.

Different considerations are made in the management of PVT in pediatric patients or those who have already received a liver transplant.

== See also ==
- Pylephlebitis
- Budd–Chiari syndrome
