= Pancreaticoduodenal veins =

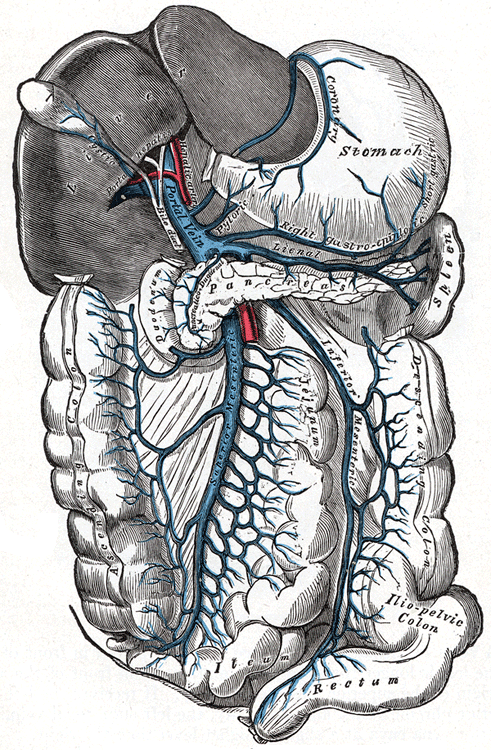
- The portal vein and its tributaries. (Pancreaticoduodenal labeled near center, at pancreas.)

Details
- Drains from: Pancreas, duodenum
- Drains to: Hepatic portal vein, superior mesenteric vein
- Artery: Inferior pancreaticoduodenal artery, superior pancreaticoduodenal artery

Identifiers
- Latin: venae pancreaticoduodenales
- TA98: A12.3.12.023
- TA2: 5118
- FMA: 70930

The pancreaticoduodenal veins accompany their corresponding arteries: the superior pancreaticoduodenal artery and the inferior pancreaticoduodenal artery; the lower of the two frequently joins the right gastroepiploic vein.
