= Cystic vein =

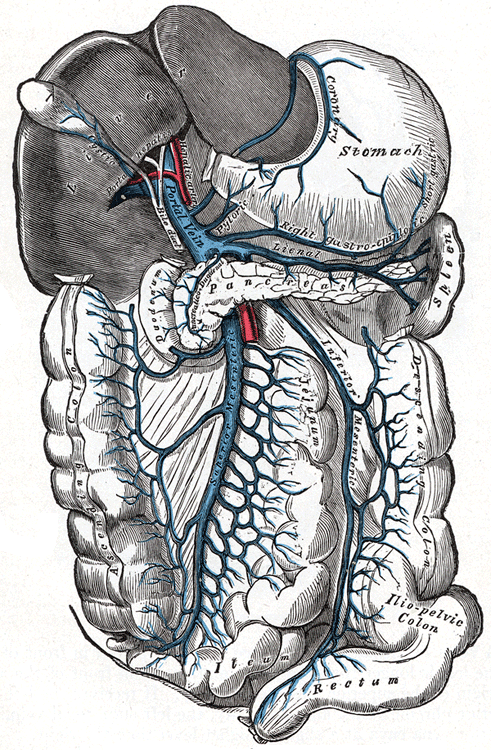
- In this depiction, a single cystic vein is visible draining the gallbladder. The upper surface of the gallbladder lies in direct contact against the visceral surface of the liver so that cystic veins may enter the liver.

Details
- Drains from: Gallbladder
- Drains to: Hepatic portal vein
- Artery: Cystic artery

Identifiers
- Latin: vena cystica
- TA98: A12.3.12.012
- TA2: 5107
- FMA: 15403

The cystic veins (usually multiple small veins rather than a single vein) drain venous blood from the gallbladder and the cystic duct. The cystic veins either drain into various branches (within the liver) and tributaries (outside the liver) of the hepatic portal vein.

Cystic veins do not accompany the cystic artery.

== Anatomy ==
Those cystic veins that arise upon the superior aspect of the body and neck of the gallbladder pass within loose connective tissue that occurs between the gallbladder and liver, they then enter the liver to drain into branches of the hepatic portal vein.

The rest of the gallbladder drains into 1-2 small cystic veins which then usually empty into either the hepatic portal vein within the liver, or into tributaries of the hepatic portal venous system that drain either the proximal bile duct or hepatic ducts. Rarely, one or more cystic veins drain into the right branch of the hepatic portal vein directly.
