= Inferior mesenteric vessels =

Inferior mesenteric vessels may refer to:

- Inferior mesenteric artery
- Inferior mesenteric vein
