= Supraduodenal artery =

Artery

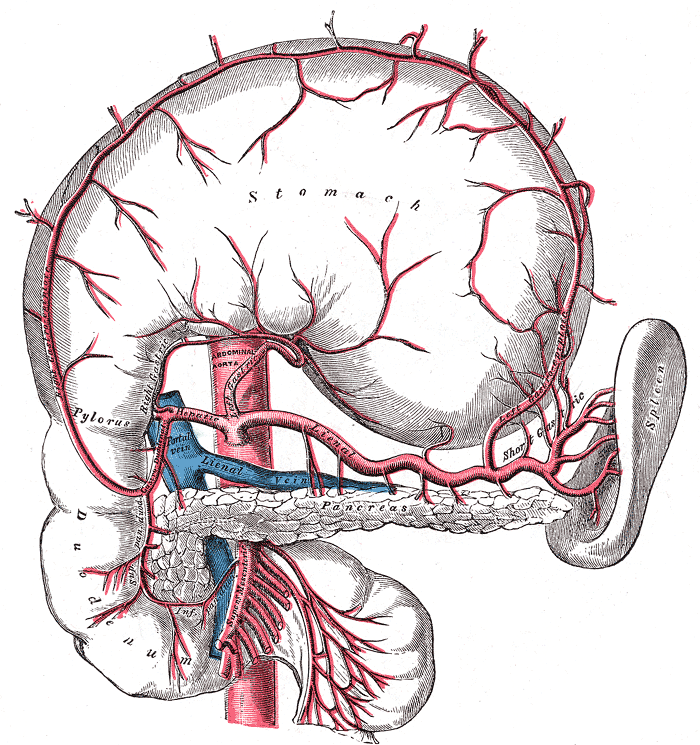
- Branches of the celiac artery.

Details
- Source: Common hepatic artery
- Supplies: Duodenum

Identifiers
- Latin: arteria supraduodenalis
- TA98: A12.2.12.017
- TA2: 4216
- FMA: 70438

The supraduodenal artery are one or two small arteries which usually arise from the gastroduodenal artery, and sometimes from the posterior superior pancreaticoduodenal arteries, or common hepatic artery. They provide arterial supply to the anterosuperior portion of the proximal duodenum.
