= Portal venous system =

Blood-vessel structure

General diagram of a portal venous system, for example, this occurs in the hypophyseal portal system between the hypothalamus and the anterior pituitary gland.

In the circulatory system of vertebrates, a portal venous system occurs when a capillary bed pools into another capillary bed through veins, without first going through the heart. Both capillary beds and the blood vessels that connect them are considered part of the portal venous system.

Most capillary beds drain into venules and veins which then drain into the heart, not into another capillary bed. There are three portal systems, two venous: the hepatic portal system and the hypophyseal portal system; and one arterial (one capillary system between two arteries): the renal portal system. Unqualified, portal venous system usually refers to the hepatic portal system. For this reason, portal vein most commonly refers to the hepatic portal vein.

The functional significance of such a system is that it transports products of one region directly to another region in relatively high concentrations. If the heart were involved in the blood circulation between those two regions, those products would be spread around the rest of the body.

== In humans ==
The human hepatic portal system delivers about three-fourths of the blood going to the liver. The final common pathway for transport of venous blood from the spleen, pancreas, gallbladder and the abdominal portion of the gastrointestinal tract (with the exception of the inferior part of the anal canal and sigmoid colon) is through the hepatic portal vein. This portal vein is formed by the union of the superior mesenteric vein and the splenic vein posterior to the neck of the pancreas at the level of vertebral body L1. Ascending towards the liver, the portal vein passes posterior to the superior part of the duodenum and enters the right margin of the lesser omentum. It is anterior to the omental foramen and posterior to both the bile duct, which is slightly to the right, and the hepatic artery proper, which is slightly to the left. On approaching the liver, the portal vein divides into right and left branches which enter the liver parenchyma. It gives off the right and left gastric veins, the cystic vein and the para-umbilical veins as tributaries.

The hypophyseal portal system transports hormones from the hypothalamus to the pituitary gland.

In the renal portal system adrenal medulla capillaries are downstream from adrenal cortex capillaries. This portal system delivers high concentrations of adrenal cortical hormones to the adrenal medulla. In particular, glucocorticoids induce the enzymatic conversion of norepinephrine to epinephrine in the adrenal medulla. By contrast, the ganglia of the sympathetic trunk mainly produce norepinephrine because their cells are not bathed in high concentrations of glucocorticoids.

The venous blood of the pancreatic islets is upstream from the capillary system of the exocrine pancreas via efferent ducts. The acini of the exocrine pancreas are therefore directly exposed to high concentrations of hormones from the endocrine pancreas, forming the pancreatic portal system.
