= Gastroduodenal artery =

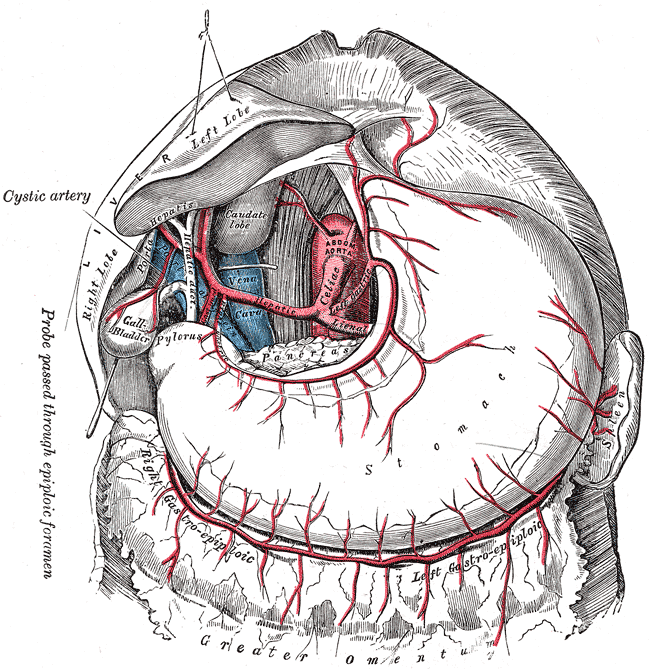
- The celiac artery and its branches.

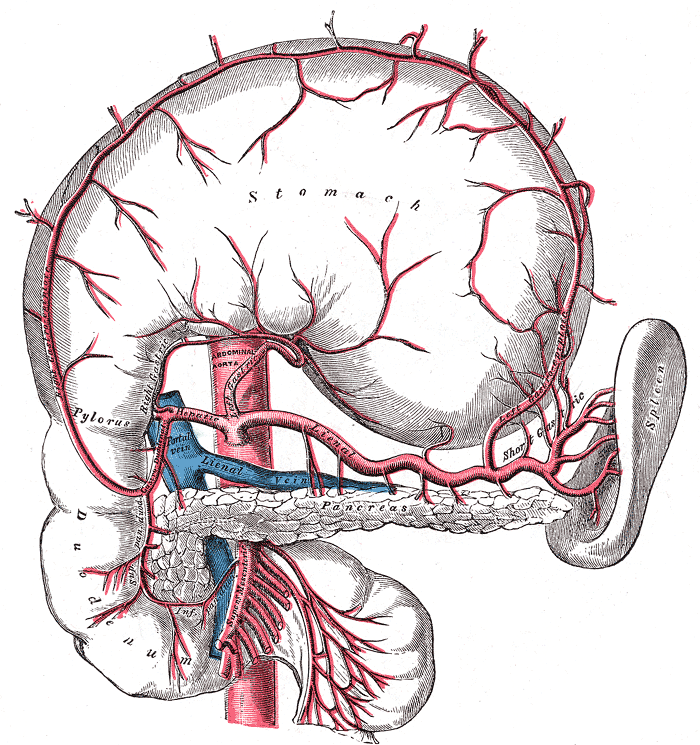
- Branches of the celiac artery. The gastroduodenal artery appears on the left part of the figure and overlays/is anterior to the portal vein. The stomach is raised and inverted - compare with celiac artery branches - stomach in situ.

Details
- Source: Common hepatic artery
- Branches: Supraduodenal artery, right gastroepiploic artery, superior pancreaticoduodenal artery
- Supplies: Pylorus, proximal duodenum

Identifiers
- Latin: arteria gastroduodenalis
- TA98: A12.2.12.016
- TA2: 4215
- FMA: 14775

In anatomy, the gastroduodenal artery is a small blood vessel in the abdomen. It supplies blood directly to the pylorus (distal part of the stomach) and proximal part of the duodenum. It also indirectly supplies the pancreatic head (via the anterior and posterior superior pancreaticoduodenal arteries).

== Structure ==
The gastroduodenal artery most commonly originates from the common hepatic artery, which is a branch of the celiac trunk. Occasionally, it may arise from the proper hepatic artery or from the right or left hepatic arteries, but these are less common anatomical variations. It first gives rise to the supraduodenal artery, followed by the posterior superior pancreaticoduodenal artery. It terminates in a bifurcation when it splits into the right gastroepiploic artery and the anterior superior pancreaticoduodenal artery (superior pancreaticoduodenal artery).

These branches form functional anastomoses with the anterior and posterior inferior pancreaticoduodenal arteries from the superior mesenteric artery. Note that the exact branching of vessels from the gastroduodenal artery is variable. Typically, the posterior and anterior superior pancreaticoduodenal arteries branch independently in that order, but can rarely come off a common trunk.

== Function ==
It supplies blood directly to the pylorus (distal part of the stomach) and proximal part of the duodenum. It also indirectly supplies the pancreatic head (via the anterior and posterior superior pancreaticoduodenal arteries).

== Clinical significance ==
=== Peptic ulcer ===
The gastroduodenal artery can be the source of a significant gastrointestinal bleed, which may arise as a complication of peptic ulcer disease. Because of its close relationship to the posteromedial wall of the second part of the duodenum, deeply penetrating ulcers or tumours of the duodenum may cause torrential bleeding from the gastroduodenal ‘artery of haemorrhage'. It occurs because the profuse arterial network in the region ensures a high flow rate in the vessel.

== Additional images ==
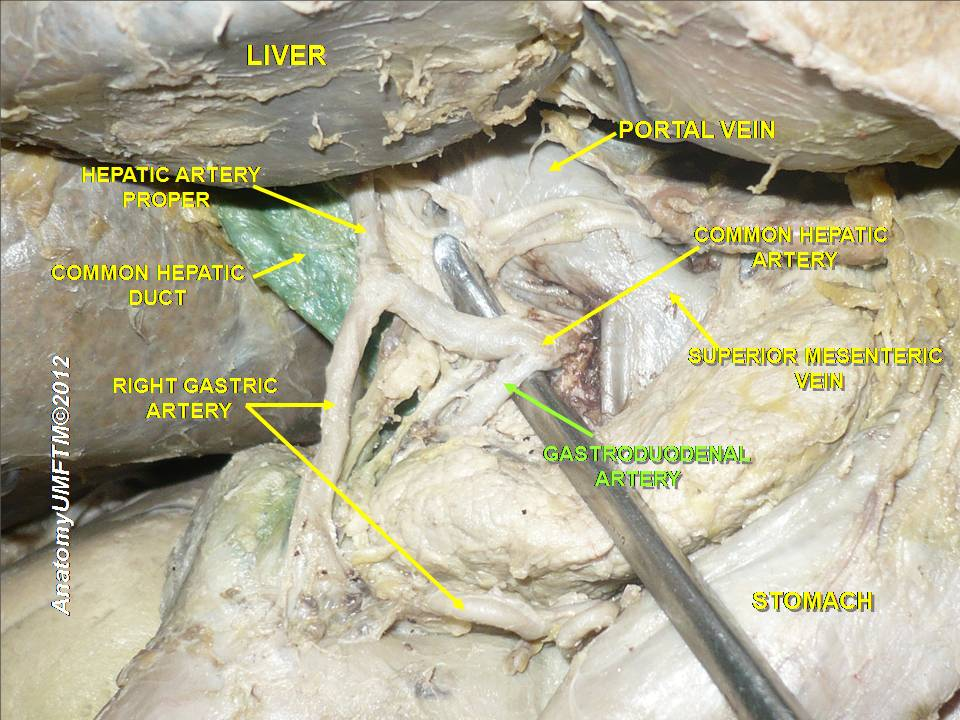
Gastroduodenal artery
