= Renal portal system =

Vertebrate blood supply system for renal tubules

A renal portal system in reptiles, and fish excluding hagfish and lampreys, is a portal venous system whose function is to supply blood to renal tubules when glomerular filtration is absent or downregulated.

== Description ==
The main channel is the renal portal vein, developed from the posterior cardinal vein, which brings venous blood circulation from the tail and groin to the kidney, where it is shunted into a capillary network around the convoluted tubules. The blood then enters the renal vein, passing either through the subcardinal veins and into the posterior cardinal veins or through the posterior vena cava.

== Variations ==
In lungfish and tetrapods, the renal portal vein is joined by a vein traveling upwards from the abdominal vein, which can bring venous blood from the hind limbs and ventral body wall into the renal portal system, or alternatively, enable blood from the tail and groin to pass into the hepatic portal system, already served by blood from the gut, via the hepatic portal vein, and from the hind legs and ventral body wall, via the abdominal vein. In fishes and salamanders, the renal portal vein branches and enters a capillary network very similar to the ones in the nephric portal system. In frogs and amniotes, metarterioles appear, with capillary networks connected to them, and sphincter muscles around the entrances to the capillaries. In birds, the system is very complex, with sphincters around the metarterioles themselves. In fishes and salamanders, due to the lack of metarterioles, all the blood passes through the capillaries. However, in frogs and amniotes, most of the blood usually passes through the metarterioles instead, although it can still be diverted through the capillary networks if need be. The system is completely abandoned in mammals, with the result that all the blood from the tail (if present), groin, pelvic area, and hind legs is forced to pass directly into the posterior vena cava, and the only blood passing out of the kidney through the renal vein is that that entered it through the renal artery. The subcardinals become the part of the posterior vena cava between the hepatic vein and the renal veins, and other portions become the internal gonadal (spermatic or ovarian) veins, and the suprarenal veins. The posterior cardinal veins become the veins of the pelvis, tail, and hind legs, and the part of the azygos vein that is closest to the heart.
