= Left colic vein =

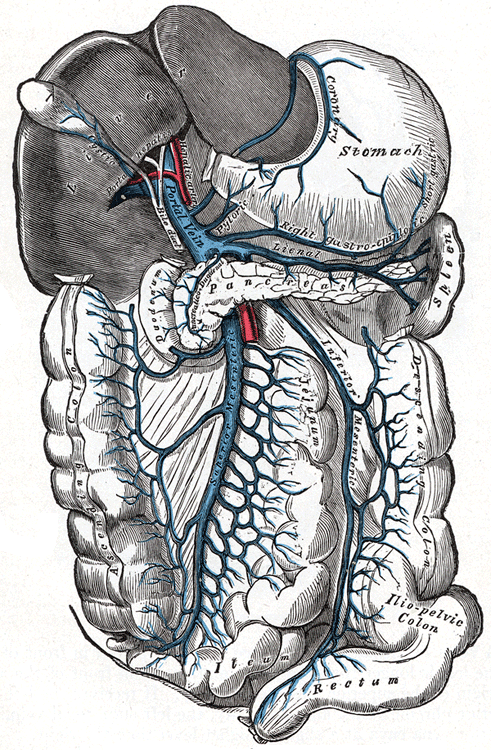
- Portal vein and tributaries. (Left colic vein visible but not labeled.)

Details
- Drains from: Descending colon
- Drains to: Inferior mesenteric vein
- Artery: Left colic artery

Identifiers
- Latin: vena colica sinistra
- TA98: A12.3.12.033
- TA2: 5128
- FMA: 15394

The left colic vein is a vein that drains the left colic flexure and descending colon. It empties into the inferior mesenteric vein. It accompanies the left colic artery.

== Anatomy ==
The left colic vein is usually situated superior to the left colic artery, and is usually shorter than the left colic artery (due to the different positions of the inferior mesenteric artery and vein).

=== Origin ===
The left colic vein is formed by the convergence of multiple tributaries, including an ascending branch and a descending branch.

=== Variation ===
The left colic vein is sometimes doubled.
