= Pylephlebitis =

Inflammation of the portal vein or any of its branches due to infection

- Other names: Pyelophlebitis and Infective suppurative thrombosis of the portal vein
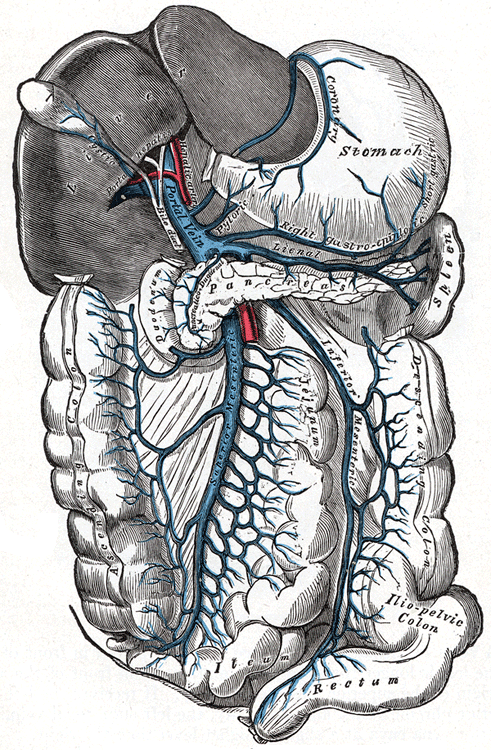
- Portal vein
- Specialty: Gastroenterology, Infectious Disease

Pylephlebitis is an uncommon thrombophlebitis of the portal vein or any of its branches (i.e. a portal vein thrombosis) that is caused by infection. It is usually a complication of intra-abdominal sepsis, most often following diverticulitis, perforated appendicitis, or peritonitis. Considered uniformly lethal in the pre-antibiotic era, it still carries a mortality of 10-30%.

== Presentation ==
It typically presents with fever, rigors, and right upper quadrant abdominal pain, but sometimes abdominal pain may be absent. Liver function test abnormalities are usually present but frank jaundice is uncommon.

== Cause ==
It is a cause of portal hypertension and can cause bowel ischemia sometimes leading to bowel infarction. Diverticulitis (26.5%) and acute appendicitis (22%) are the two most common causes. Pylephlebitis is caused by a single pathogen in 43% of cases and polymicrobial in 27% of cases. The most frequently isolated bacteria are Escherichia coli (25%), Bacteroides spp. (17%), and Streptococcus spp. (15%).

== Diagnosis ==
In the modern era, it is usually diagnosed by CT scans of the abdomen and pelvis. Bacteriology is often polymicrobial and blood cultures are positive in some cases. A significant fraction of people presenting with this condition have an underlying hypercoagulable state.

== Treatment ==
Treatment is with a prolonged course of broad-spectrum antibiotics, with the addition of anticoagulants if other clots are present outside the portal vein or if fever persists on antibiotic therapy.
