= Left gastric vein =

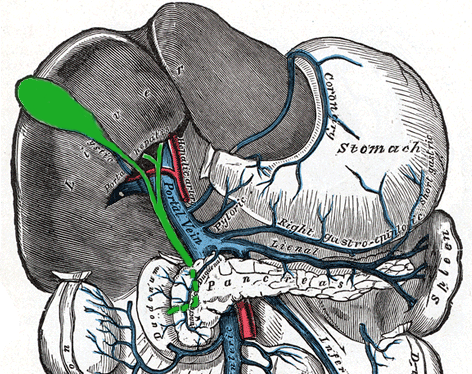
- The portal vein and its tributaries, the left gastric vein is labelled as the coronary vein

Details
- Drains from: Lesser curvature of the stomach
- Drains to: Portal vein

Identifiers
- Latin: vena gastrica sinistra
- TA98: A12.3.12.015
- TA2: 5110
- FMA: 15399

The left gastric vein (or coronary vein) is a vein that derives from tributaries draining the lesser curvature of the stomach.

== Structure ==
The left gastric vein runs from right to left along the lesser curvature of the stomach. It passes to the esophageal opening of the stomach, where it receives some esophageal veins. It then turns backward and passes from left to right behind the omental bursa. It drains into the portal vein near the superior border of the pancreas.

== Function ==
The left gastric vein drains deoxygenated blood from the lesser curvature of the stomach. It also acts as collaterals between the portal vein and the systemic venous system of the lower esophagus (azygos vein).

== Clinical significance ==
The esophageal branch of the left gastric vein drains into the azygos vein. In cases of portal hypertension, this communication allows for blood to bypass the portal vein and reach systemic circulation. As a result of this anastomosis, development of esophageal and paraesophageal varices is possible.

== See also ==
- Portacaval anastomosis
- Right gastric vein
