= Pancreatic veins =

Veins which drain blood from the pancreas

Details
- Drains from: Pancreas
- Drains to: Splenic vein

Identifiers
- Latin: venae pancreaticae
- TA98: A12.3.12.022; A12.3.12.029
- TA2: 5124
- FMA: 70929

In human anatomy, the pancreatic veins consist of several small blood vessels which drain the body and tail of the pancreas, and open into the trunk of the great pancreatic vein.
