= Inferior mesenteric vein =

Vein which drains blood from the large intestine

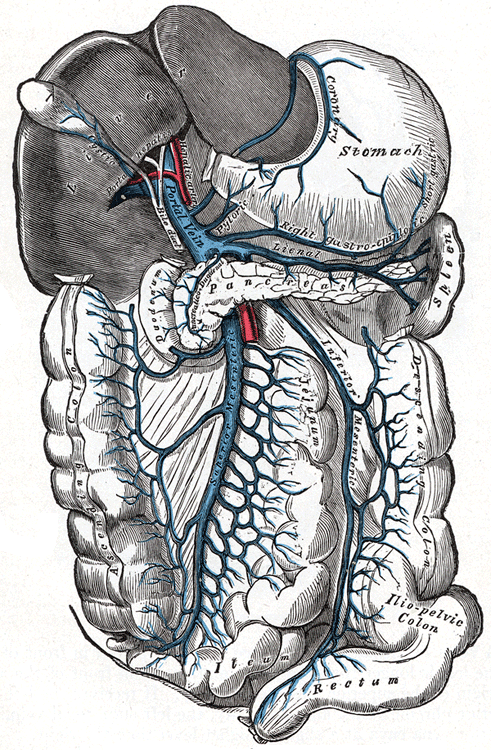
- The portal vein and its tributaries. The superior mesenteric vein and splenic vein, into which the inferior mesenteric vein empties. Leinal vein is an old term for splenic vein. Anatomical position.

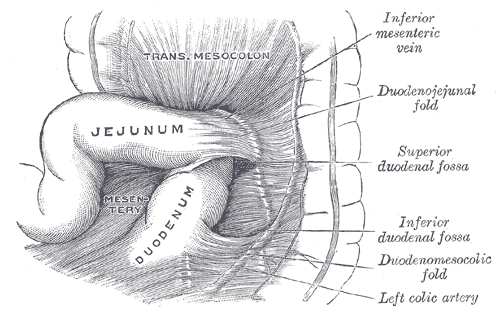
- Superior and inferior duodenal fossæ.

Details
- System: Hepatic portal system
- Drains from: Gastrointestinal tract
- Source: Left colic vein, sigmoid veins, superior rectal vein,
- Drains to: Splenic vein
- Artery: Inferior mesenteric artery

Identifiers
- Latin: vena mesenterica inferior
- TA98: A12.3.12.032
- TA2: 5127
- FMA: 15391

In human anatomy, the inferior mesenteric vein (IMV) is a blood vessel that drains blood from the large intestine. It usually terminates when reaching the splenic vein, which goes on to form the portal vein with the superior mesenteric vein (SMV).

== Structure ==
The inferior mesenteric vein merges with the splenic vein, posterior to the middle of the body of the pancreas. The splenic vein then merges with the superior mesenteric vein to form the portal vein.

=== Tributaries ===
Tributaries of the inferior mesenteric vein drain the large intestine, sigmoid colon and rectum. These include:

- left colic vein
- sigmoid veins
- superior rectal vein
- rectosigmoid veins

=== Variation ===
Anatomical variations include the inferior mesenteric vein draining into the confluence of the superior mesenteric vein and splenic vein and the inferior mesenteric vein draining in the superior mesenteric vein.

== Clinical significance ==
The inferior mesenteric vein may be damaged during surgery on the body and tail of the pancreas. If a serious laceration occurs, the inferior mesenteric vein may be ligated, as other veins can drain the large intestine.

== Additional images ==
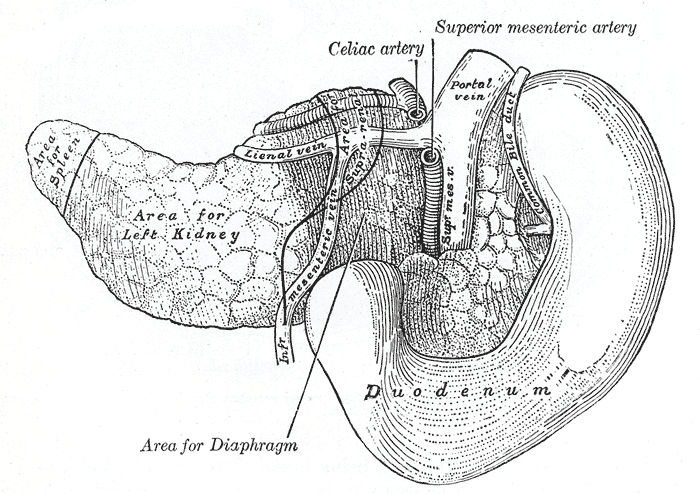
The pancreas and duodenum from behind.
