= Inferior pancreaticoduodenal artery =

Artery of the abdomen

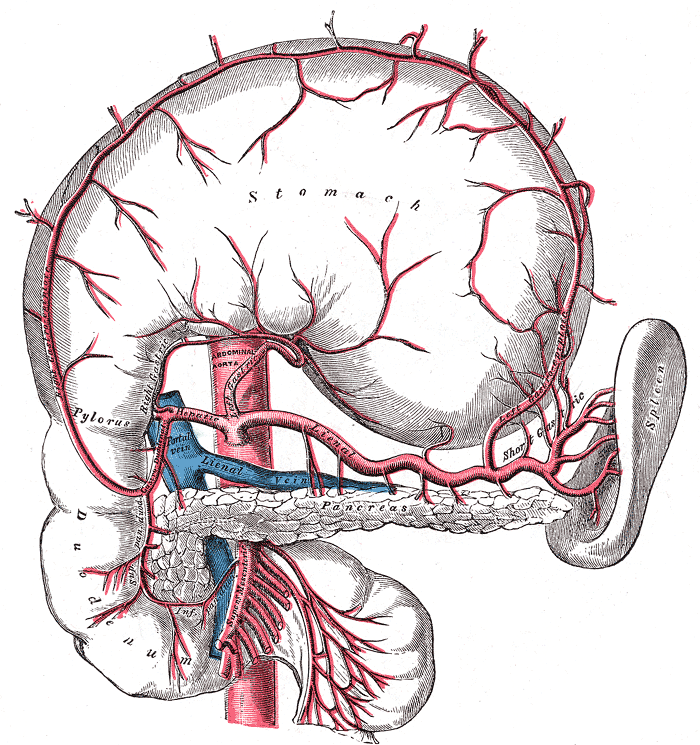
- The celiac artery and its branches; the stomach has been raised and the peritoneum removed. (Inf. pan. duo. a. visible at lower left.)

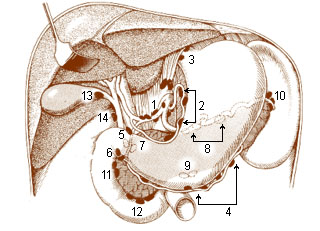
- Inferior pancreaticoduodenal is at #12.

Details
- Source: Superior mesenteric artery
- Vein: Pancreaticoduodenal veins

Identifiers
- Latin: arteriae pancreaticoduodenales inferiores
- TA98: A12.2.12.054
- TA2: 4253
- FMA: 14805

The inferior pancreaticoduodenal artery (the IPDA) is a branch of the superior mesenteric artery. It supplies the head of the pancreas, and the ascending and inferior parts of the duodenum. Rarely, it may have an aneurysm.

== Structure ==
The inferior pancreaticoduodenal artery is a branch of the superior mesenteric artery. This occurs opposite the upper border of the inferior part of the duodenum. As soon as it branches, it divides into anterior and posterior branches. These run between the head of the pancreas and the lesser curvature of the duodenum. They then join (anastomose) with the anterior and posterior branches of the superior pancreaticoduodenal artery.

=== Variation ===
The inferior pancreaticoduodenal artery may branch from the first intestinal branch of the superior mesenteric artery rather than directly from it.

== Function ==
The inferior pancreaticoduodenal artery distributes branches to the head of the pancreas and to the ascending and inferior parts of the duodenum.

== Clinical significance ==
=== Aneurysm ===
Very rarely, the inferior pancreaticoduodenal artery may have an aneurysm. It may be caused by certain medical interventions, major trauma, pancreatitis, cholecystitis, and vasculitis and other infections. A ruptured aneurysm causes abdominal pain, and haemorrhage leads to hypotension. It may be treated with open abdominal surgery. It may also be treated with endovascular surgery, such as a coil. These aneurysms represent around 2% of aneurysms in visceral arteries of the abdomen. Pseudoaneurysm may also occur.

== History ==
The inferior pancreaticoduodenal artery may be more simply known by the acronym IPDA.

== Additional images ==
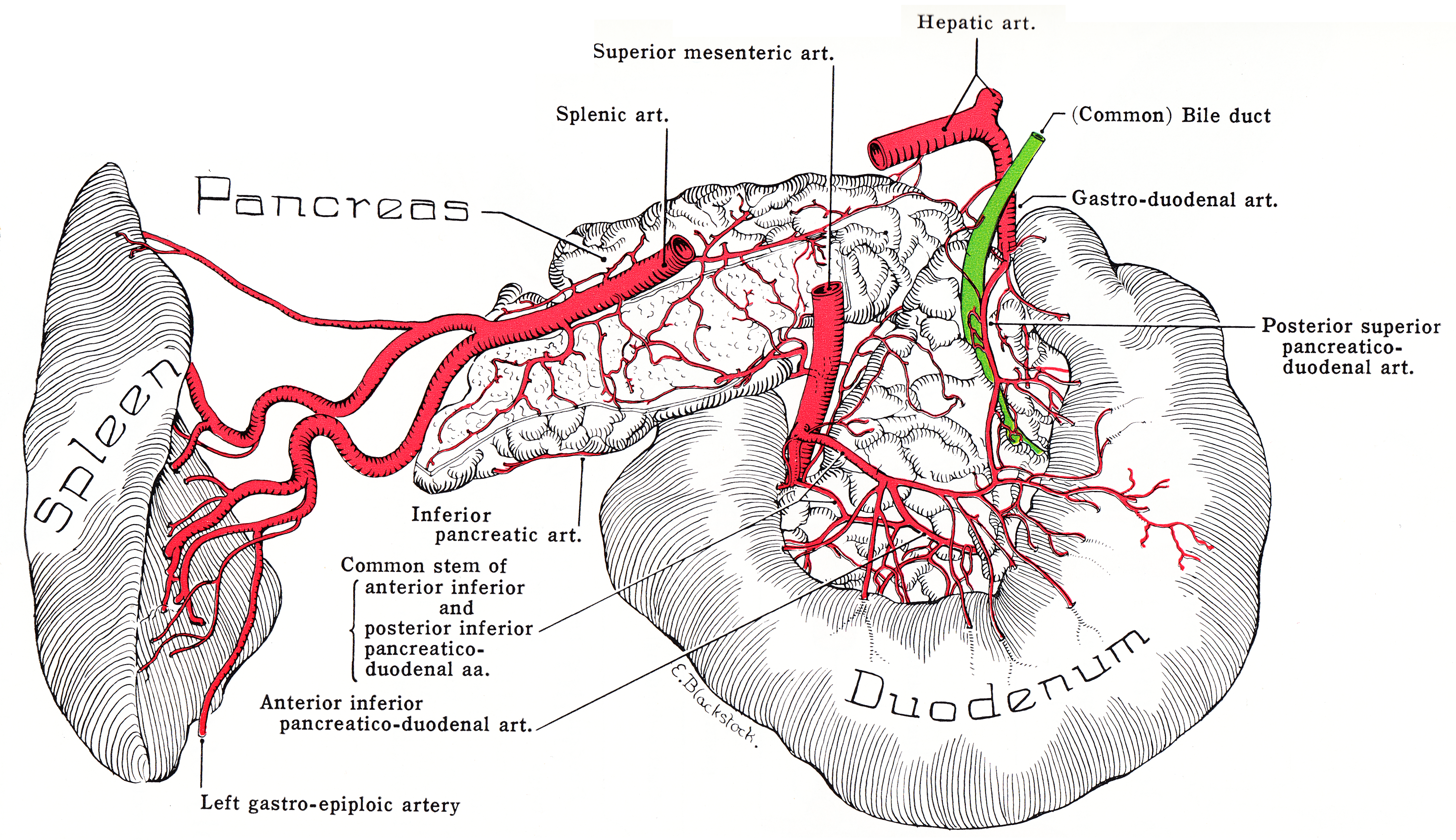
Anatomical dissection showing the origin of the two inferior pancreaticoduodenal arteries
