= Superior pancreaticoduodenal artery =

Artery

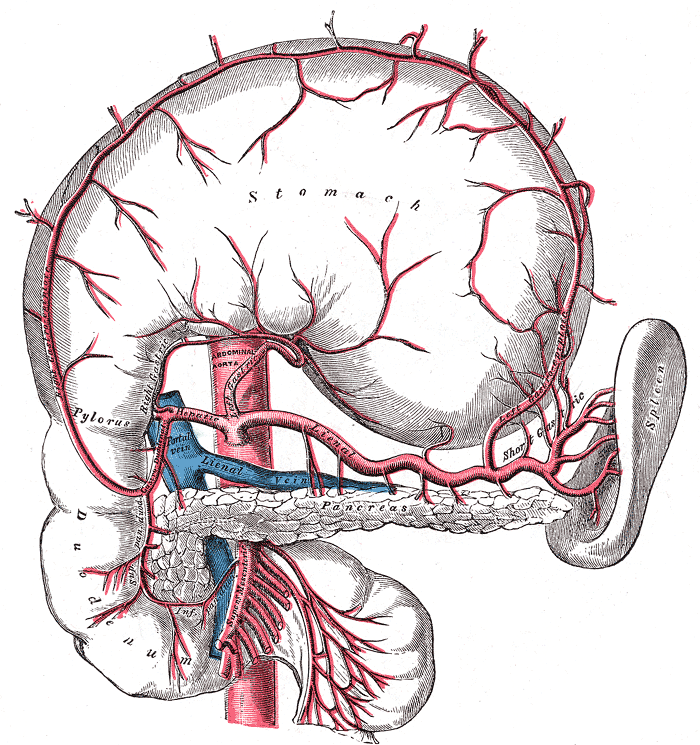
- The celiac artery and its branches; the stomach has been reflected superiorly and the peritoneum removed. (Superior pancreaticoduodenal labeled at center left.)

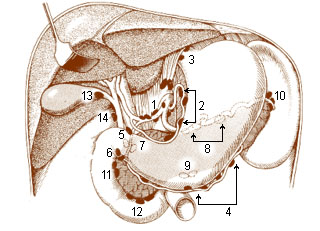
- Superior pancreaticoduodenal is at #11.

Details
- Source: Gastroduodenal artery
- Vein: Pancreaticoduodenal veins
- Supplies: Duodenum, pancreas

Identifiers
- Latin: arteria pancreaticoduodenalis superior
- FMA: 70437

The superior pancreaticoduodenal artery is an artery that supplies blood to the duodenum and pancreas.

== Structure ==
It is a branch of the gastroduodenal artery, which most commonly arises from the common hepatic artery of the celiac trunk, although there are numerous variations of the origin of the gastroduodenal artery.

The pancreaticoduodenal artery divides into two branches as it descends, an anterior and posterior branch. These branches then travel around the head of the pancreas and duodenum, eventually joining with the anterior and posterior branches of the inferior pancreaticoduodenal artery. The inferior pancreaticoduodenal artery is a branch of the superior mesenteric artery. These arteries, together with the pancreatic branches of the splenic artery, form connections or anastomoses with one another, allowing blood to perfuse the pancreas and duodenum through multiple channels.

=== Distribution ===
The artery supplies the anterior and posterior sides of the duodenum and head of pancreas, with the anterior branch supply the anterior surface and similarly for the posterior.

The artery supplies the part of the duodenum proximal to the level of the major duodenal papilla of the descending part of the duodenum.

== Additional images ==
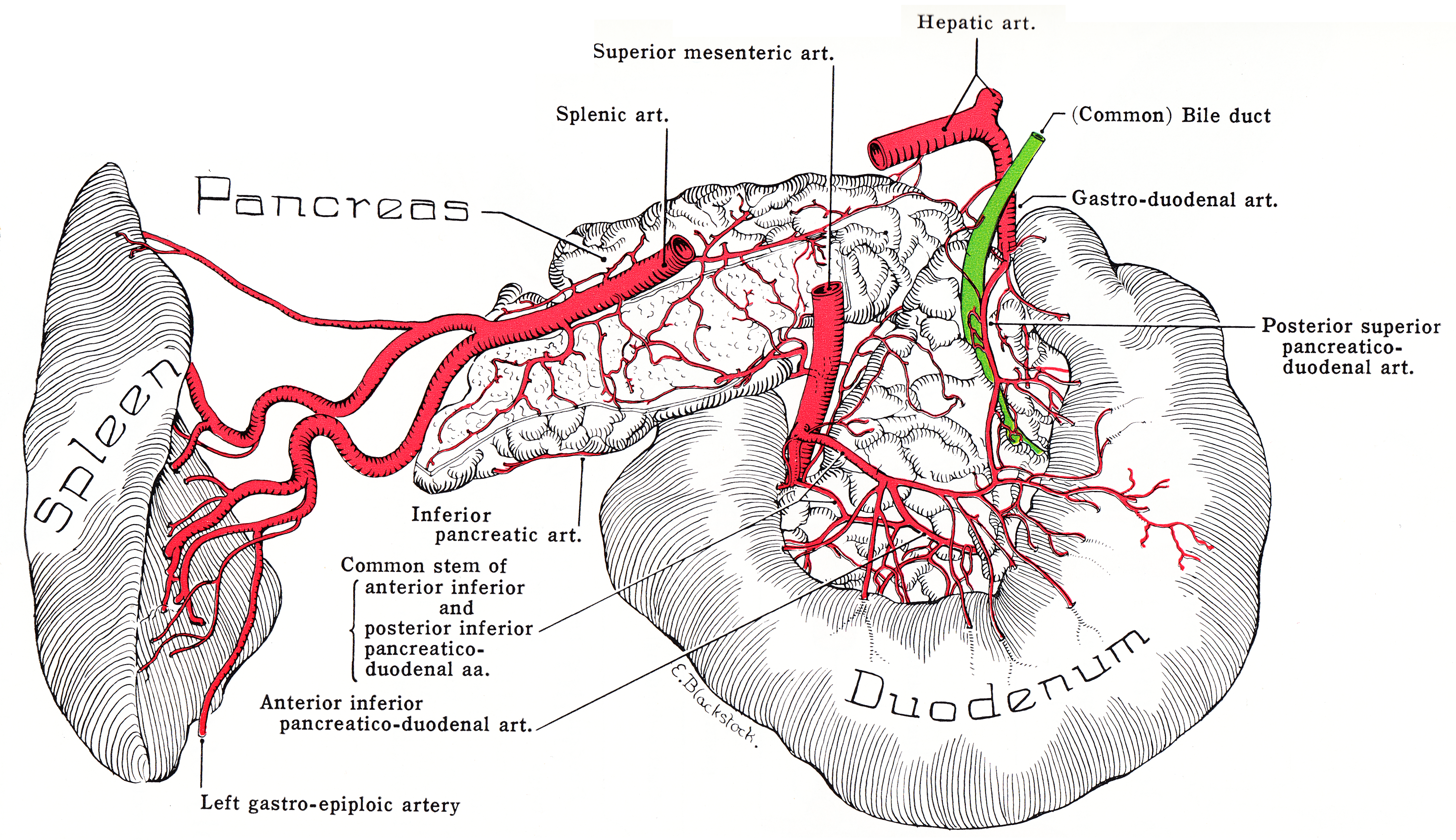
Anatomical dissection showing the origin of the posterior superior pancreaticoduodenal arteries
