= Splenic vein =

Vein that drains blood from the spleen, stomach and pancreas

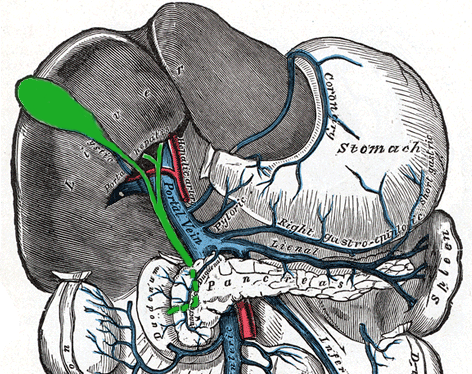
- The splenic vein, here called the "lienal vein", travels from the spleen, above the pancreas, and ends in the portal vein.

Details
- System: Hepatic portal system
- Drains from: Trabecular vein of spleen
- Source: Short gastric veins, left gastroepiploic vein, pancreatic veins, inferior mesenteric vein
- Drains to: Hepatic portal vein
- Artery: Splenic artery

Identifiers
- Latin: vena lienalis
- MeSH: D013162
- TA98: A12.3.12.028
- TA2: 5123
- FMA: 14331

In human anatomy, the splenic vein (formerly the lienal vein) is a blood vessel that drains blood from the spleen, the stomach fundus and part of the pancreas. It is part of the hepatic portal system.

== Structure ==
The splenic vein is formed from small venules that leave the spleen. It travels above the pancreas, alongside the splenic artery. It collects branches from the stomach and pancreas, and most notably from the large intestine (also drained by the superior mesenteric vein) via the inferior mesenteric vein, which drains in the splenic vein shortly before the origin of the hepatic portal vein. The splenic vein ends in the portal vein, formed when the splenic vein joins the superior mesenteric vein.

== Clinical significance ==
The splenic vein can be affected by thrombosis, presenting some of the characteristics of portal vein thrombosis and portal hypertension but localized to part of the territory drained by the splenic vein. These include varices in the stomach wall due to hypertension in the short gastric veins and abdominal pain. This results in gastric varices, in which the treatment of choice would be splenectomy. The most common cause for splenic vein thrombosis is both chronic and acute pancreatitis.

== Additional images ==
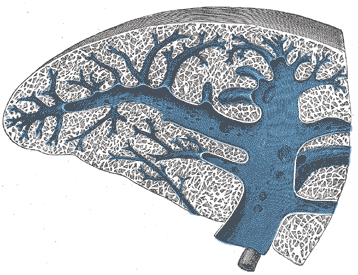
Cross-section of the spleen, showing the splenic vein and its tributaries.
