= Hepatic portal system =

System of veins comprising the hepatic portal vein and its tributaries

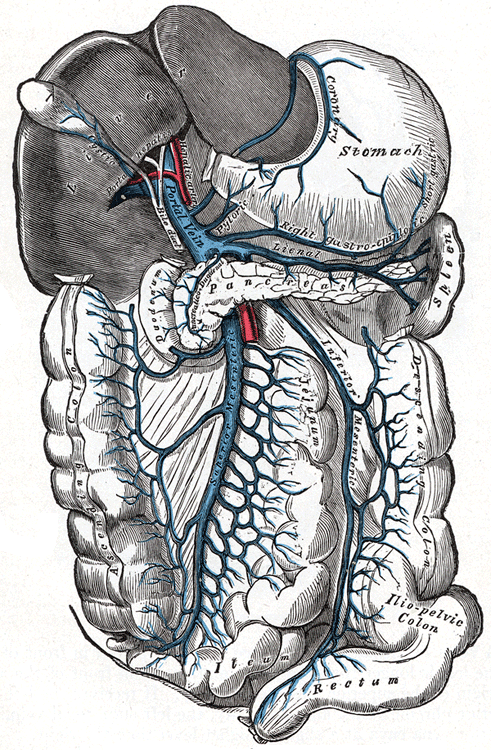
- The hepatic portal vein and its territory

Details
- Location: Abdomen

In human anatomy, the hepatic portal system or portal venous system is a system of veins comprising the portal vein and its tributaries. The other portal venous system in the body is the hypophyseal portal system.

== Structure ==
Large veins that are considered part of the portal venous system are the:

- Hepatic portal vein
- Splenic vein
- Superior mesenteric vein
- Inferior mesenteric vein

The superior mesenteric vein and the splenic vein come together to form the actual hepatic portal vein. The inferior mesenteric vein connects in the majority of people on the splenic vein, but in some people, it is known to connect on the portal vein or the superior mesenteric vein.

Roughly, the portal venous system corresponds to areas supplied by the celiac trunk, the superior mesenteric artery, and the inferior mesenteric artery.

== Function ==
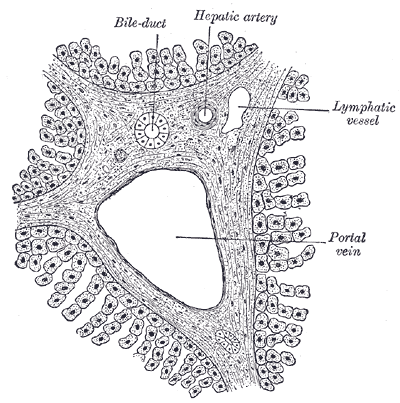
Microscopic section through a small portal vein branch inside the liver (×250 magnified)

The portal venous system is responsible for directing blood from parts of the gastrointestinal tract to the liver. Substances absorbed in the small intestine travel first to the liver for processing before continuing to the heart. Not all of the gastrointestinal tract is part of this system. The system extends from about the lower portion of the esophagus to the upper part of the anal canal. It also includes venous drainage from the spleen, pancreas and visceral fat.

The benefit of first-pass metabolism, whereby substances absorbed from food in the gut pass through the liver before entering the systemic circulation, is to use the liver as a shield (a first line of defense) between (a) the food, its toxins (whatever they may be), and its metabolic intermediates/metabolites (such as ammonia) and (b) the rest of the body's tissues, including the brain. The necessity of such a system is demonstrated by what happens when the system breaks down, as seen when advanced hepatic fibrosis in cirrhosis leads to hepatic encephalopathy in the brain owing to the blood being loaded with ammonia and other substances not conducive to brain function.

Blood flow to the liver is unique in that it receives both oxygenated and (partially) deoxygenated blood. As a result, the partial gas pressure of oxygen (pO_{2}) and perfusion pressure of portal blood are lower than in other organs of the body. Blood passes from branches of the portal vein through cavities between "plates" of hepatocytes called sinusoids. Blood also flows from branches of the hepatic artery and mixes in the sinusoids to supply the hepatocytes with oxygen. This mixture percolates through the sinusoids and collects in a central vein which drains into the hepatic vein. The hepatic vein subsequently drains into the inferior vena cava.

The hepatic artery provides 30 to 40% of the oxygen to the liver, while only accounting for 25% of the total liver blood flow. The rest comes from the partially deoxygenated blood from the portal vein. The liver consumes about 20% of the total body oxygen when at rest. That is why the total liver blood flow is quite high, at about 1 litre a minute and up to two litres a minute. That is on average one fourth of the average cardiac output at rest.

== Clinical significance ==
Portal hypertension is a condition in which the blood pressure of the portal venous system is too high. It is often the result of cirrhosis of the liver. Liver cirrhosis can lead to increased intrahepatic vascular resistance and vasodilation of portal system arteries, both of which increase pressure in the portal vein. Color Doppler Ultrasound is the most useful imaging tool used to identify aneurysms, thrombosis, and branching patterns of the portal venous system, and to determine if treatment or surgery will be necessary. In preparation for surgery, Color Doppler Ultrasound is used to identify portal vein branching patterns to ensure preserved portal perfusion and choose appropriate vessel connections for a liver transplant.

=== Drug metabolism ===
Many drugs that are absorbed through the GI tract are substantially metabolized by the liver before reaching general circulation. This is known as the first pass effect. As a consequence, certain drugs can only be taken via certain routes. For example, nitroglycerin cannot be swallowed because the liver would deactivate the medication, but it can be taken under the tongue or transdermally (through the skin) and thus is absorbed in a way that bypasses the portal venous system. Inversely, dextromethorphan, a cough suppressor, is best taken orally because it needs to be metabolised by the liver into dextrorphan in order to be effective. This latter principle is that of most prodrugs.

The use of suppositories is a way to partially bypass the portal vein: the upper 1/3 of the rectum is drained into the portal vein while the lower 2/3 are drained into the internal iliac vein that goes directly in the inferior vena cava (thus bypassing the liver).

== See also ==
- Systemic venous system
- Pulmonary venous system
