= Superior mesenteric vein =

Vein which drains blood from the small intestine

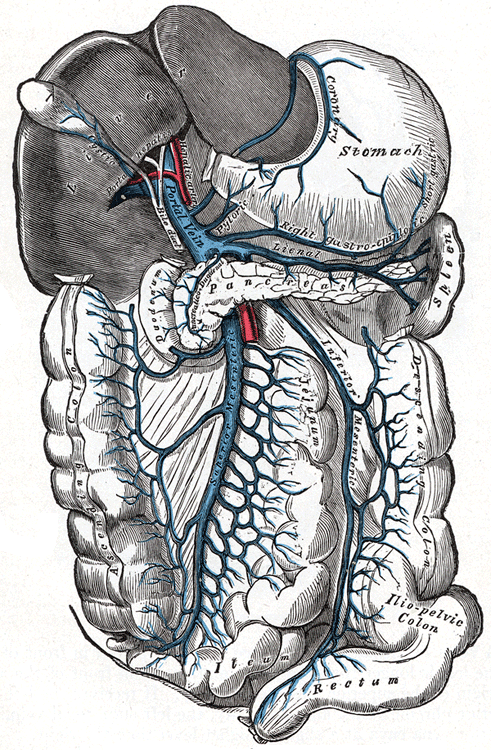
- The abdomen viewed from the front, showing the portal venous system, showing the superior mesenteric vein and its tributaries. (Lienal vein is an old term for splenic vein.)

Details
- System: Hepatic portal system
- Drains to: Hepatic portal vein
- Artery: Superior mesenteric artery

Identifiers
- Latin: vena mesenterica superior
- TA98: A12.3.12.018
- TA2: 5113
- FMA: 14332

In human anatomy, the superior mesenteric vein (SMV) is a blood vessel that drains blood from the small intestine (jejunum and ileum). Behind the neck of the pancreas, the superior mesenteric vein combines with the splenic vein to form the portal vein that carries blood to the liver. The superior mesenteric vein lies to the right of the similarly named artery, the superior mesenteric artery, which originates from the abdominal aorta.

== Structure ==
Tributaries of the superior mesenteric vein drain the small intestine, large intestine, stomach, pancreas and appendix and include:

- Right gastro-omental vein (also known as the right gastro-epiploic vein)
- inferior pancreaticoduodenal veins
- veins from jejunum
- veins from ileum
- middle colic vein – drains the transverse colon
- right colic vein – drains the ascending colon
- ileocolic vein

The superior mesenteric vein combines with the splenic vein to form the portal vein.

== Clinical significance ==
Thrombosis of the superior mesenteric vein is quite rare, but a significant cause of mesenteric ischemia and can be fatal. It is estimated that 10–15% of mesenteric ischemia is due to mesenteric thrombosis.

== Additional images ==
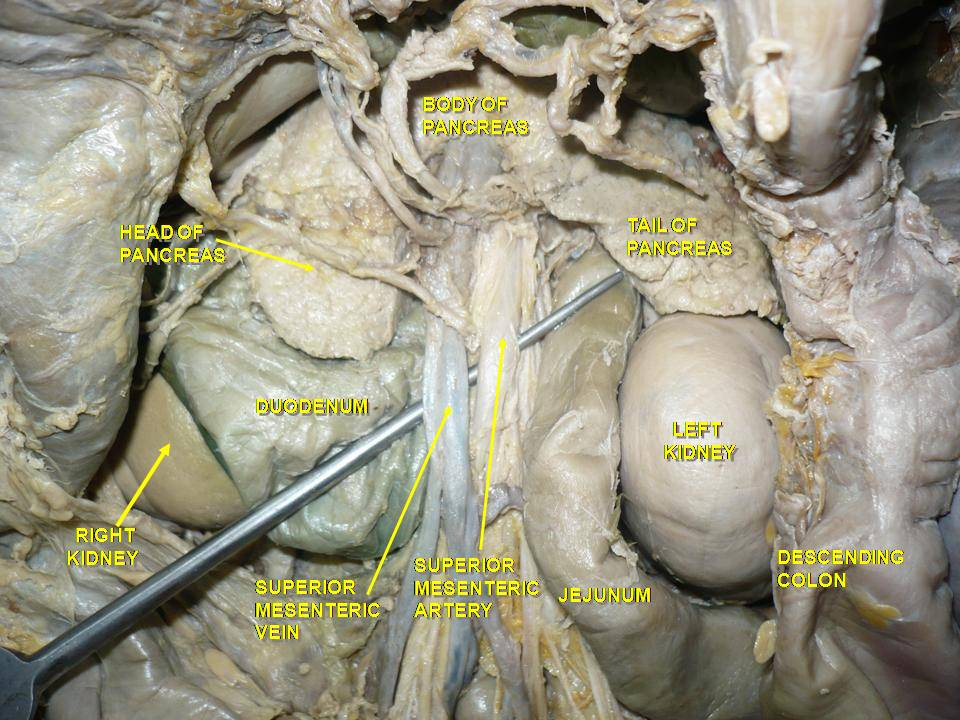
Abdominal cavity.Superior mesenteric vein.Deep dissection.
