= Portal vein =

Vein carrying blood from the GI tract, gallbladder, pancreas and spleen to the liver

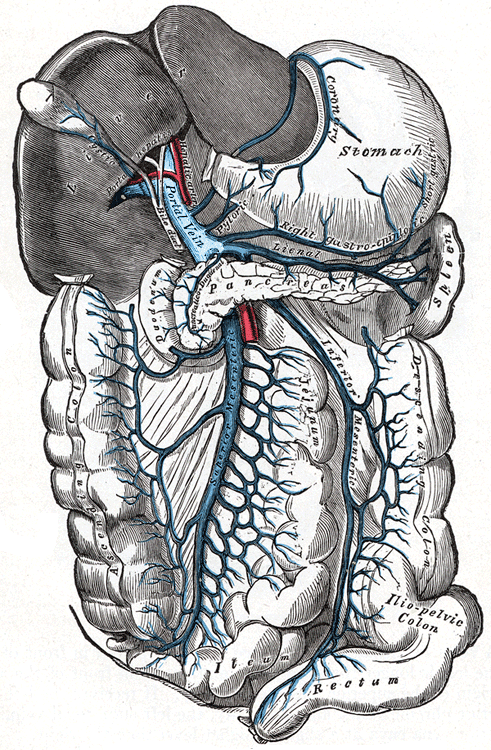
- The portal vein (in light blue) and its tributaries. It is formed by the superior mesenteric vein, inferior mesenteric vein, and splenic vein. Lienal vein is an old term for splenic vein.

Details
- System: Hepatic portal system
- Drains from: Gastrointestinal tract, spleen, pancreas
- Source: Splenic vein, superior mesenteric vein, inferior mesenteric vein, pancreatic vein
- Drains to: Liver sinusoid

Identifiers
- Latin: vena portae hepatis
- MeSH: D011169
- TA98: A12.3.12.001
- TA2: 5092
- FMA: 50735

The portal vein or hepatic portal vein (HPV) is a blood vessel that carries blood from the gastrointestinal tract, gallbladder, pancreas and spleen to the liver. This blood contains nutrients and toxins extracted from digested contents. Approximately 75% of total liver blood flow is through the portal vein, with the remainder coming from the hepatic artery proper. The blood leaves the liver to the heart in the hepatic veins.

The portal vein is not a true vein, because it conducts blood to capillary beds in the liver and not directly to the heart. It is a major component of the hepatic portal system, one of two portal venous systems in the human body; the other is the hypophyseal portal system. Some reptiles have an additional renal portal system not present in mammals.

The portal vein is usually formed by the confluence of the superior mesenteric, splenic veins, inferior mesenteric, left, right gastric veins and the pancreatic vein.

Conditions involving the portal vein cause considerable illness and death. An important example of such a condition is elevated blood pressure in the portal vein. This condition, called portal hypertension, is a major complication of cirrhosis. In abdominal obesity, fats, inflammatory cytokines and other toxic substances are transported by the portal vein from visceral fat into the liver, leading to hepatic insulin resistance and metabolic dysfunction–associated steatotic liver disease.

== Structure ==
Measuring approximately 8 cm (3 inches) long in adults, the portal vein is located in the right upper quadrant of the abdomen, originating behind the neck of the pancreas.

In most individuals, the portal vein is formed by the union of the superior mesenteric vein and the splenic vein. For this reason, the portal vein is occasionally called the splenic-mesenteric confluence. Occasionally, the portal vein also directly communicates with the inferior mesenteric vein, although this is highly variable. Other tributaries of the portal vein include the cystic and the left and right gastric veins, as well as the paraumbilical and prepyloric veins.

Tributaries of the hepatic portal vein
- Splenic vein
- Superior mesenteric vein
- Inferior mesenteric vein
- Left and right gastric veins
- Cystic vein

Immediately before reaching the liver, the portal vein divides into right and left. It ramifies further, forming smaller venous branches and ultimately portal venules. Each portal venule courses alongside a hepatic arteriole and the two vessels form the vascular components of the portal triad. These vessels ultimately empty into the hepatic sinusoids to supply blood to the liver.

=== Portacaval anastomoses ===
The portal venous system has several anastomoses with the systemic venous system. In cases of portal hypertension these anastomoses may become engorged, dilated, or varicosed and subsequently rupture.

=== Accessory hepatic portal veins ===
Accessory hepatic portal veins are those veins that drain directly into the liver without joining the hepatic portal vein. These include the paraumbilical veins as well as veins of the lesser omentum, falciform ligament, and those draining the gallbladder wall.

== Function ==
The portal vein and hepatic arteries form the liver's dual blood supply, with 90% of hepatic blood flow and 70% of oxygen supplied by the portal vein, and the remainder by hepatic arteries. Due to its double blood supply, the liver is far less affected by vascular disease compared to other major internal organs.

Unlike most veins, the portal vein does not drain into the heart. Rather, it is part of a portal venous system that delivers venous blood into another capillary system, the hepatic sinusoids of the liver. In carrying venous blood from the gastrointestinal tract to the liver, the portal vein accomplishes two tasks: it supplies the liver with metabolic substrates and it ensures that substances ingested are first processed by the liver before reaching the systemic circulation. This accomplishes two things. First, possible toxins that may be ingested can be detoxified by the hepatocytes before they are released into the systemic circulation. Second, the liver is the first organ to absorb nutrients just taken in by the intestines. After draining into the liver sinusoids, blood from the liver is drained by the hepatic vein.

== Clinical significance ==
=== Portal hypertension ===
Increased blood pressure in the portal vein, called portal hypertension, is a major complication of liver disease, most commonly cirrhosis. A dilated portal vein (diameter of greater than 13 or 15 mm) is a sign of portal hypertension, with a sensitivity estimated at 12.5% or 40%. On Doppler ultrasonography, the main portal vein (MPV) peak systolic velocity normally ranges between 20 cm/s and 40 cm/s. A slow velocity of <16 cm/s in addition to dilatation in the MPV are diagnostic of portal hypertension.

Clinical signs of portal hypertension include those of chronic liver disease: ascites, esophageal varices, spider nevi, caput medusae, and palmar erythema.

=== Pulsatility ===
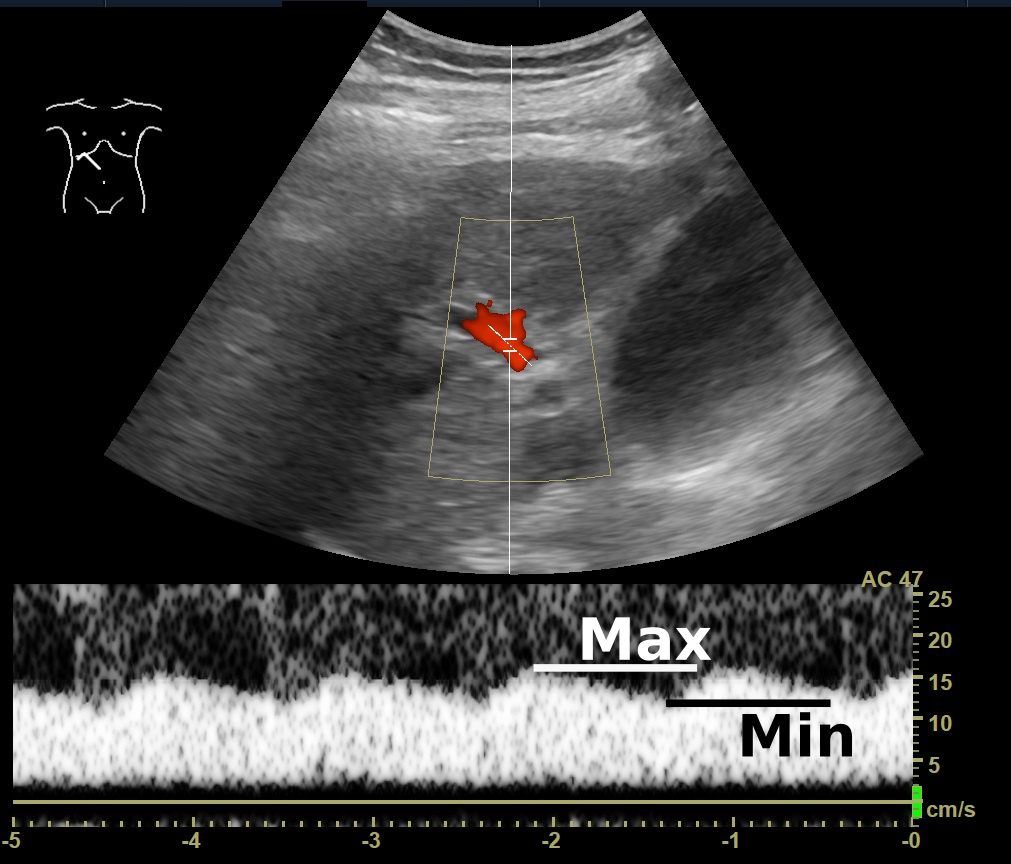
Doppler ultrasonography of the portal vein over 5 seconds, showing peaks of maximal velocity, as well as points of minimal velocity.

Portal vein pulsatility can be measured by Doppler ultrasonography. An increased pulsatility may be caused by cirrhosis, as well as increased right atrial pressure (which in turn may be caused by right heart failure or tricuspid regurgitation). Portal vein pulsatility can be quantified by pulsatility indices (PI), where an index above a certain cutoff indicates pathology:

Pulsatility indices (PI)
Index	Calculation	Cutoff
Average-based	(Max - Min) / Average	0.5
Max-based	(Max - Min) / Max	0.5 - 0.54

=== Infection ===
Pylephlebitis is infection of the portal vein, usually arising from an infectious intra-abdominal process such as diverticulitis.

=== Portal venous gas ===
Hepatic portal venous gas is a rare finding on radiological exams. Gas is shown to enter the portal venous system. It is most commonly caused by intestinal ischemia but has also been associated with colon cancer.

== Additional images ==
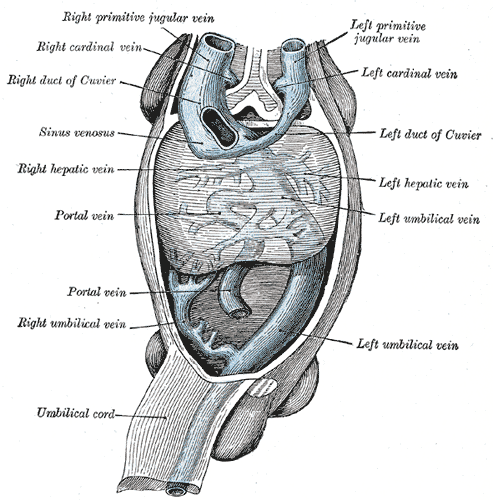
Human embryo with heart and anterior body-wall removed to show the sinus venosus and its tributaries

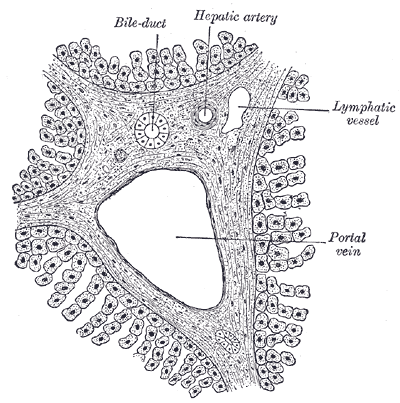
Section across the portal triad of the pig

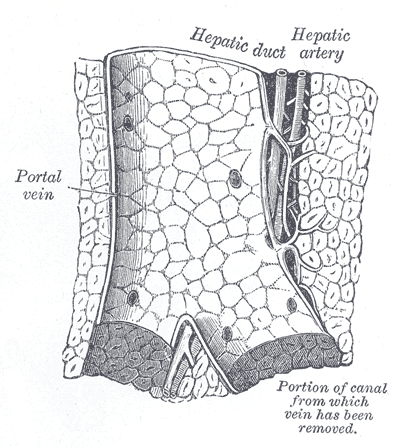
Longitudinal section of a small portal vein and canal

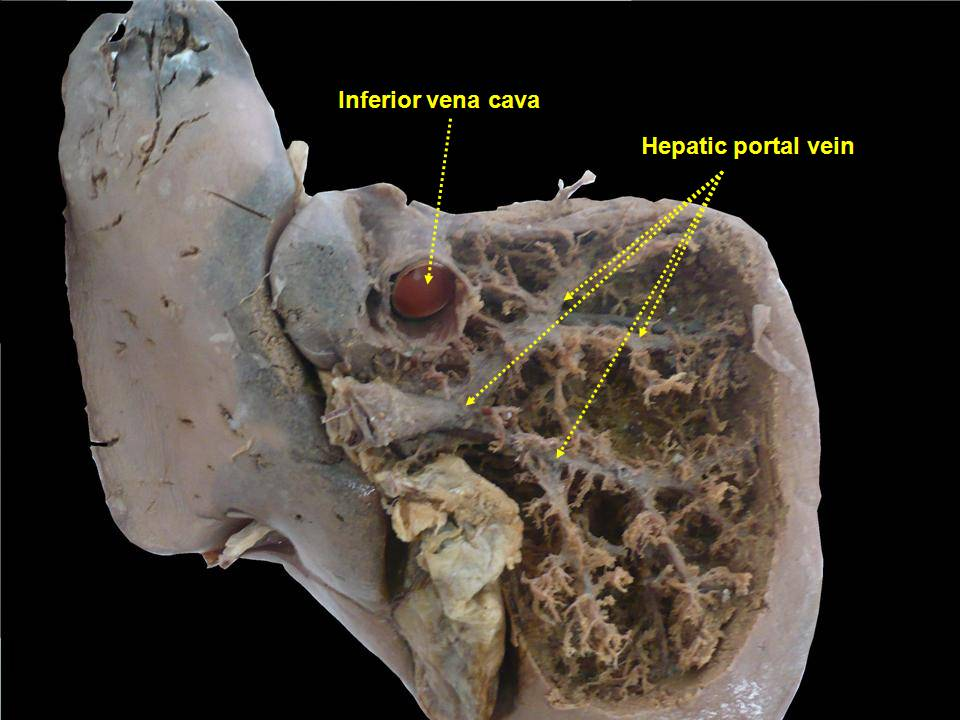
Hepatic portal vein. Plastination technique.

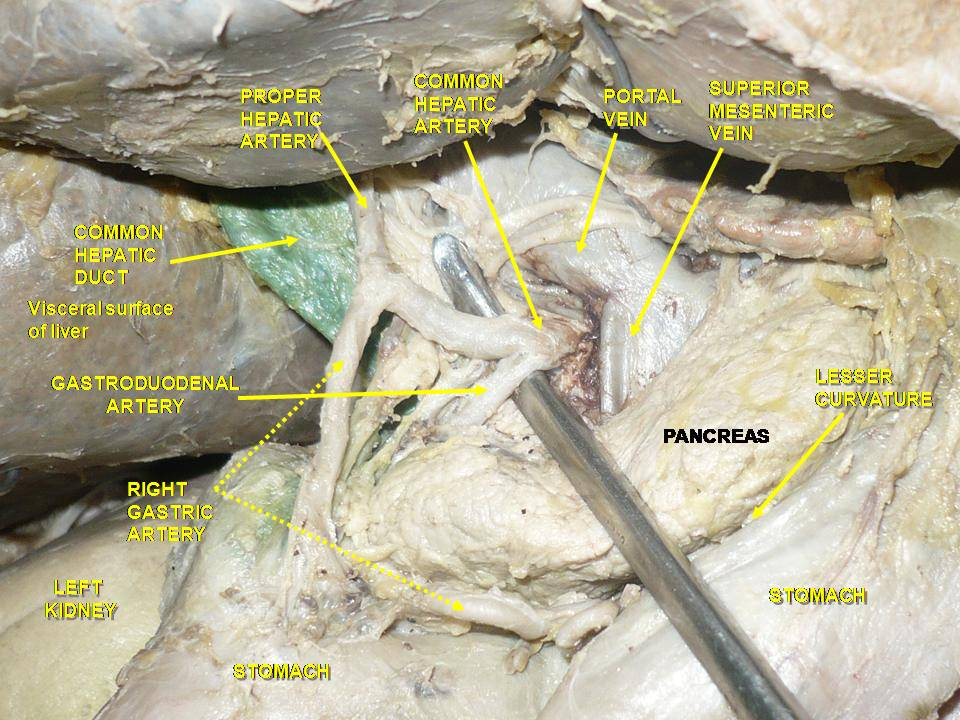
Hepatic portal vein. Abdominal cavity. Deep dissection.

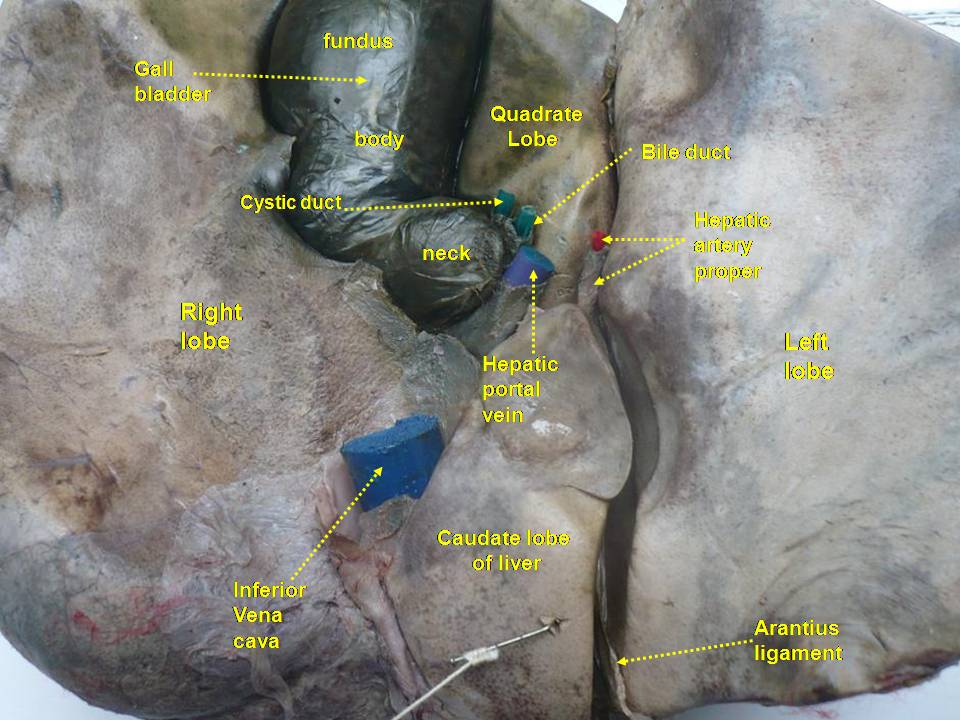
Hepatic portal vein. Visceral surface of liver.
