= Trabecular arteries =

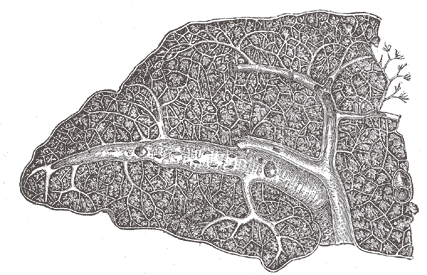
- Transverse section of the human spleen, showing the distribution of the splenic artery and its branches

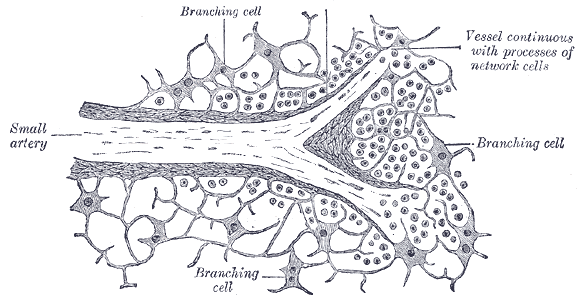
- Section of the spleen, showing the termination of the small blood vessels.

Details
- Source: Splenic artery
- Branches: Sinusoids
- Vein: Trabecular veins
- Supplies: Spleen

The trabecular arteries are the name of the branches of the splenic artery after it passes into the trabeculae of the spleen, where it branches. When these arteries then reach the white pulp, and become covered with periarteriolar lymphoid sheaths, the name changes again to central arteries (or central arterioles). Branches of the central arteries are given to the red pulp, and these are called penicillar arteries).

== Details ==
The lienal artery is remarkable for its large size in proportion to the size of the organ, and also for its tortuous course. It divides into six or more branches, which enter the hilum of the spleen and ramify throughout its substance, receiving sheaths from an involution of the external fibrous tissue.

Similar sheaths also invest the nerves and veins.

Each branch runs in the transverse axis of the organ, from within outward, diminishing in size during its transit, and giving off in its passage smaller branches, some of which pass to the anterior, others to the posterior part.

These ultimately leave the trabecular sheaths, and terminate in the proper substance of the spleen in small tufts or pencils of minute arterioles, which open into the interstices of the reticulum formed by the branched sustentacular cells.

Each of the larger branches of the artery supplies chiefly that region of the organ in which the branch ramifies, having no anastomosis with the majority of the other branches.

The arterioles, supported by the minute trabeculae, traverse the pulp in all directions in bundles (penicilli) of straight vessels.

Their trabecular sheaths gradually undergo a transformation, become much thickened, and converted into adenoid tissue; the bundles of connective tissue becoming looser and their fibrils more delicate, and containing in their interstices an abundance of lymph corpuscles.

The altered coat of the arterioles, consisting of adenoid tissue, presents here and there thickenings of a spheroidal shape, the white pulp.

The arterioles end by opening freely into the splenic pulp; their walls become much attenuated, they lose their tubular character, and the endothelial cells become altered, presenting a branched appearance, and acquiring processes which are directly connected with the processes of the reticular cells of the pulp.

In this manner the vessels end, and the blood flowing through them finds its way into the interstices of the reticulated tissue of the splenic pulp.
