= Splenic marginal zone lymphoma =

- Specialty: Hematology, oncology

Splenic marginal zone lymphoma (SMZL) is a type of marginal zone lymphoma, a cancer made up of B-cells that replace the normal architecture of the white pulp of the spleen. The neoplastic cells are both small lymphocytes and larger, transformed lymphoblasts, and they invade the mantle zone of splenic follicles and erode the marginal zone, ultimately invading the red pulp of the spleen. Frequently, the bone marrow and splenic hilar lymph nodes are involved along with the peripheral blood. The neoplastic cells circulating in the peripheral blood are termed villous lymphocytes due to their characteristic appearance.

== Cause ==
The cell of origin is postulated to be a post-germinal center B-cell with an unknown degree of differentiation. SMZL is a form of cancer known to be associated with Hepatitis C virus infection.

== Molecular biology ==
=== Immunophenotype ===
Antigen	Status
CD20	Positive
CD79a	Positive
CD5	Negative
CD10	Negative
CD23	Negative
CD43	Negative
cyclin D1	Negative

The relevant markers that define the immunophenotype for SMZL are shown in the adjacent table. The lack of CD5 expression is helpful in the discrimination between SMZL and chronic lymphocytic leukemia/small lymphocytic lymphoma, and the lack of CD10 expression argues against follicular lymphoma. Mantle cell lymphoma is excluded due to the lack of CD5 and cyclin-D1 expression.

=== Genetics ===
Clonal rearrangements of the immunoglobulin genes (heavy and light chains) are frequently seen. The deletion 7q21-32 is seen in 40% of SMZL patients, and translocations of the CDK6 gene located at 7q21 have also been reported.

== Diagnosis ==
Enlargement of the spleen is a requirement for the diagnosis of SMZL and is seen in nearly all people affected by SMZL (often without lymphadenopathy). Aside from the uniform involvement of the spleen, the bone marrow is frequently positive in patients with SMZL displaying a nodular pattern with morphology similar to what is observed in the splenic hilar lymph nodes. While nodal and extranodal involvement are rare, hilar lymph nodes adjacent to the spleen, if involved, show an effaced architecture without preservation of the marginal zone seen in the spleen.

Circulating lymphoma cells are sometimes present in peripheral blood, and they occasionally show short villi at the poles of cells and plasmacytoid differentiation.Autoimmune thrombocytopenia and anemia are sometimes seen in patients with SMZL. A monoclonal paraprotein is detected in a third of patients without hypergammaglobulinemia or hyperviscosity.Reactive germinal centers in splenic white pulp are replaced by small neoplastic lymphocytes that efface the mantle zone and ultimately blend in with the marginal zone with occasional larger neoplastic cells that resemble blasts. The red pulp is always involved, with both nodules of larger neoplastic cells and sheets of the small neoplastic lymphocytes. Other features that may be seen include sinus invasion, epithelial histocytes, and plasmacytic differentiation of neoplastic cells.

== Prognosis ==
Three-quarters of patients survive five or more years; more than half of patients with SMZL survive more than a decade after diagnosis.

Patients who have a hemoglobin level of less than 12 g/dL, a lactate dehydrogenase level higher than normal, and/or a blood serum albumin levels of less than 3.5 g/dL are likely to have more an aggressive disease course and a shorter survival. However, even high-risk patients have even odds of living for five years after diagnosis.

Some genetic mutations, such as mutations in NOTCH2, are also correlated with shorter survival.

== Epidemiology ==
Less than 1% of all lymphomas are splenic marginal zone lymphomas and it is postulated that SMZL may represent a large fraction of unclassifiable CD5- chronic lymphocytic leukemias. The typical patient is over the age of 50, and gender preference has been described.

== Synonyms ==
Under older classification systems, the following names were used:

Classification system	Name
Rappaport	well-differentiated lymphocytic lymphoma
Lukes-Collins	small lymphocytic lymphoma
Working Formulation	small lymphocytic lymphoma
FAB	splenic lymphoma with circulating villous lymphocytes

== See also ==
- List of hematologic conditions
