= Bostrom =

Bostrom or Boström or Bostrem may refer to:

== People ==
- Arthur Bostrom (born 1955), English actor
- Ben Bostrom (born 1974), American motorcycle racer
- Christopher Jacob Boström (1797–1866), Swedish philosopher
- Curt Boström (1926–2014), Swedish politician
- Derrick Bostrom (born 1960), American drummer
- Donald Boström (born 1954), Swedish journalist, photographer and writer
- Ebba Boström (1844–1902), Swedish nurse and philanthropist
- Eric Bostrom (born 1976), American motorcycle racer, brother of Ben
- Erik Gustaf Boström (1842–1907), Swedish landowner and politician
- Erik Boström (1869–1932), Swedish sport shooter
- Eugen Bostroem (1850–1928), German pathologist
- Figge Boström (born 1969), Swedish musician, songwriter, and music producer
- Harvey Bostrom (born 1946), Canadian politician from Manitoba
- Helge Bostrom (1894–1977), Canadian ice hockey player
- Justin Bostrom (born 1986), American ice hockey player
- Kirsi Boström (born 1968), Finnish orienteering competitor
- Mårten Boström (born 1982), Finnish orienteering competitor and long-distance runner
- Mikael Boström (born 1970), Finnish orienteering competitor
- Nick Bostrom (born 1973), Swedish philosopher
- Peter Boström (born 1971), Swedish producer and songwriter
- Sixten Boström (born 1963), Finnish football player
- Wollmar Boström (1878–1956), Swedish diplomat and tennis player
- Zachary Bostrom (born 1981), American actor

== Fictional characters ==
- Patrik Boström (see Andra Avenyn)
- Nilla Boström (see Andra Avenyn)

== Places ==
- 25108 Boström, a Main Belt minor planet named after Johan Ingemar Boström
- Bostrom High School, in Phoenix Union High School District
- Bostrem Bay (see 4th Battalion (Australia))
- Eric Bostrom Three-Decker, a historic triple decker house in Worcester, Massachusetts

== Concepts ==
- Bostrom's tripartition (Nick Bostrom)
- Splenogonadal fusion (Eugen Bostroem)
