= Max Wilms =

German pathologist and surgeon (1867–1918)

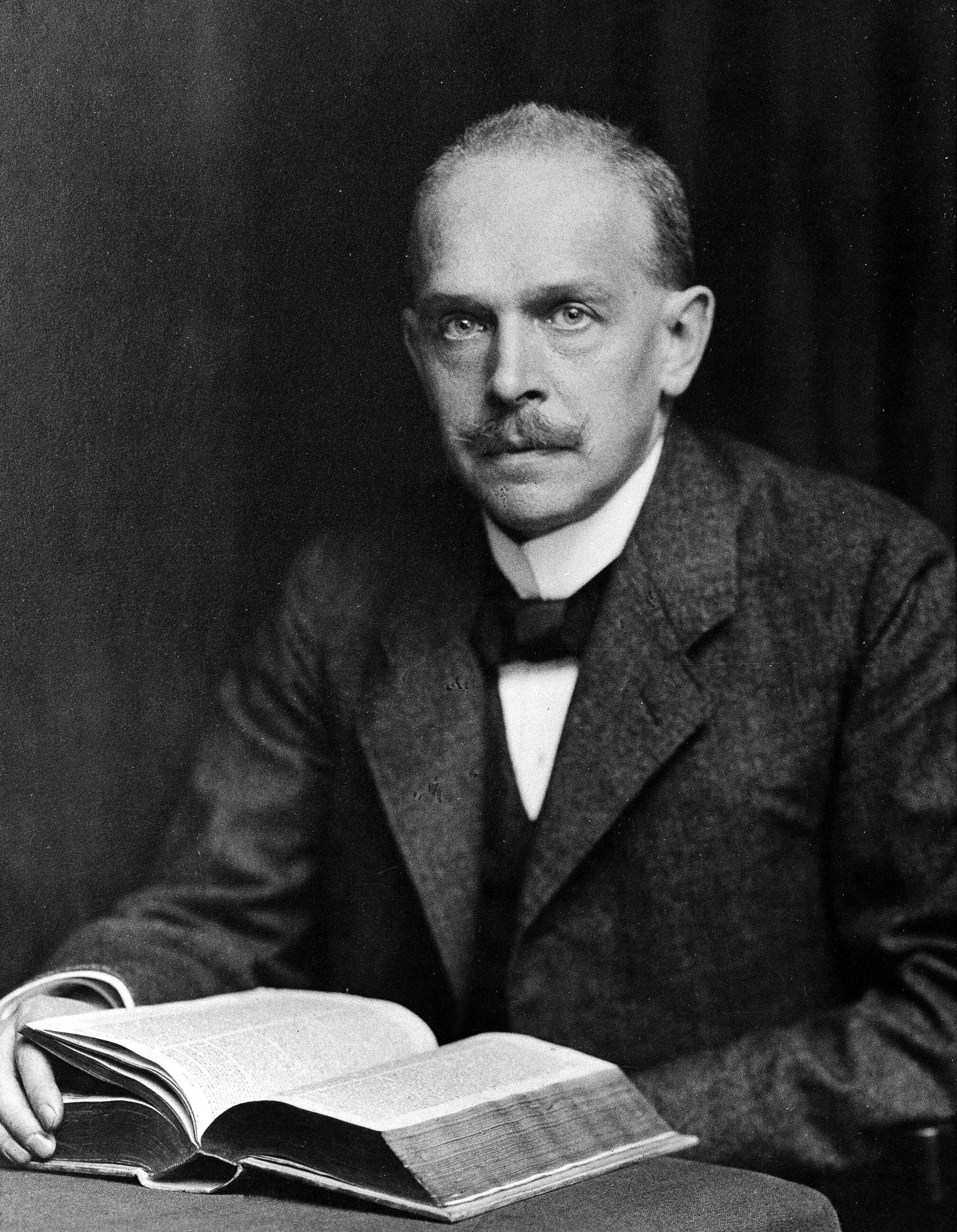
Max Wilms

Carl Max Wilhelm Wilms (German pronunciation: [maks ˈvɪlms]; 5 November 1867 – 14 May 1918) was a German pathologist and surgeon who was a native of Hünshoven, which today is part of the town Geilenkirchen.

In 1890, he earned his medical doctorate from the University of Bonn, and afterwards was an assistant to pathologist Eugen Bostroem (1850–1928) in Giessen and to internist Otto Michael Ludwig Leichtenstern (1845–1900) in Cologne. In 1899, he began training as a surgeon at Leipzig. In 1907, he became a professor of surgery at Basel. In 1910, he attained the chair of surgery at the University of Heidelberg.

In May 1918, while performing emergency surgery on a French POW who had a swollen larynx associated with diphtheria, Wilms became infected with the disease, and died within a few days at the age of 50.

Reportedly, he was successful in saving the life of the French soldier. After his death, his position at Heidelberg was filled by surgeon Eugen Enderlen (1863–1940).

Wilms is remembered for his work in the field of nephrology, and his pathological studies concerning the development of tumor cells. In his research of renal tumors, he proposed that tumor cells originate during the development of the embryo. He published his findings in an influential 1899 monograph, titled Die Mischgeschwülste der Niere.

As a result of his extensive work involving renal tumors, another name for "nephroblastoma" is Wilms' tumor, a malignant tumor of the kidney.

Wilms made several contributions as a surgeon and is credited for introducing a partial rib resection used in the treatment for pulmonary tuberculosis. He introduced perineal prostatectomy via lateral incision.

Wilms also worked extensively in the field of radiology, using radiation therapy for treatment of tumors and tuberculosis. Wilms is credited for developing a manometer for measurement of cerebrospinal fluid pressure.

With surgeon Ludwig Wullstein (1864–1930), he co-authored and published Lehrbuch der Chirurgie, a surgical textbook that was translated into several languages.
