= Splenocyte =

Splenocytes are the immune cells of the spleen, where they contribute to both innate and adaptive immune responses. They include macrophages, B cells, T cells, dendritic cells, and antibody-producing plasmablasts. Their distribution and functions vary among the spleen's red pulp, marginal zone, and white pulp; splenocytes participate in the removal of aged erythrocytes, immune responses to blood-borne antigens, and antibody production.

Splenocytes arise from hematopoietic stem cells in the bone marrow and develop through myeloid and lymphoid lineages before localizing to the spleen. Their composition and immune activity can change with aging and in response to stress.

== Structure and Function of Splenocytes ==
=== Red Pulp Splenocytes ===
The red pulp is partially responsible for the spleen’s innate immune response. It serves as the primary filter for old erythrocytes (red blood cells), which have stiffening membranes that differentiate them from newer, healthy erythrocytes. The macrophages housed in the red pulp, a kind of splenocyte, are able to dispose of these erythrocytes through phagocytosis. Once the erythrocyte is hydrolyzed, these splenocytes are able to release or store its iron content for future use by the body or to ensure that bacteria are unable to use the iron for their vital functions. The red pulp also serves as a site where plasmablasts lodge, which are known to produce large amounts of antibodies.

=== Marginal Zone Splenocytes ===
The marginal zone acts as a transit pathway between the bloodstream and the white pulp area and assists the other regions with their specific immune responses. It also contains a large population of various splenocytes, including two layers of macrophages separated by a layer of B-cells and dendritic cells. The B-cells in the marginal zone are able to translocate themselves to the white pulp, but their structure is specific to their location of origin and they can be easily differentiated under microscopy.

=== White Pulp Splenocytes ===
The white pulp is responsible for the spleen’s adaptive immune response and primarily houses numerous T-cells, B-cells, and dendritic cells that are able to identify previously-encountered pathogens and ensure they are removed from the bloodstream quickly. These white pulp splenocytes are contained within established zones, defining their function. When antigen presenting cells (APCs, splenocytes) from the red pulp or marginal zone enter the T-cell zone with a known antigen, the splenocytes are activated and they are able to carry out their immune system functions to eliminate the pathogens.

=== Splenocyte Role in Antitumor Immune System ===
Splenocytes play an important role in many immune functions, but a specific example lies within the antitumor immune system. As studied by comparing antitumor immune function in mice with and without spleens, it was discovered that the lack of splenocyte and splenic activity greatly decreases antitumor activity. The livers of the mice were injected with colon cancer cells, with the number of liver metastases measured at 10 days. The splenectomy group had an average of 19.2 liver metastases, compared to 1.5 metastases of the spleen-preserved group. While animal-focused, this study serves as a good indicator of a very strong correlation between splenocyte activity and tumor fighting/prevention activity.

== Early Development of Splenocytes ==
=== Evolutionary Development ===
The spleen, unlike other lymphoid organs that have remained mostly unchanged since early vertebrate development, has changed significantly. While spleens seem to have developed early in vertebrate evolution, they are believed to have begun only containing red pulp, with splenocytes joining the picture much later to form the marginal zone and white pulp.

=== Early Development ===
Spleen cell development is widely unstudied, so the timing and progenitor cells are widely unknown. Currently, there is no known linear hierarchy of gene expression in early development, but the most widely supported assumption is that Pbx1 and Tcf21 are upstream regulators of spleen cell development. It is thought to originate from the mesoderm, specifically the dorsal pancreatic mesenchyme.

Splenocytes, like all immune cells, originate in the bone marrow as hematopoietic stem cells before further differentiating and translocating to the spleen. HSCs can then differentiate into either a myeloid stem cell or a common lymphoid progenitor cell, which then further differentiate into monocytes/macrophages or T-cells/B-cells respectively. T-cells require one more step before translocation to the spleen, which involves movement to the thymus for final differentiation steps. Once cells are fully mature, they travel to the spleen and are able to perform their specialized functions as splenocytes.

== Effectors of Splenocyte Function ==
=== Aging ===
Like all other bodily systems, aging leads to a strong decline of splenocyte function. Aging alters the concentrations of most immune cells, changing the strength of reactions of both the innate and adaptive immune responses. Most importantly, though, is the effect of aging on the differentiation potential of immune cells, affecting their regeneration and distribution throughout the body. If immune cells are created at different concentrations and are less mobile throughout the body, splenic function seriously declines.

In studies done comparing elderly and younger mice populations, it was found that the aged mice populations showed a significant tendency towards myeloid, progenitor for monocytes and macrophages, differentiation, rather than common progenitor cells, for T-cells and B-cells. This decreases the body’s capacity for identifying and fighting pathogens that it has encountered previously.

=== Stress ===
Stress has long been known to suppress typical immune responses, and there is no difference when it comes to splenocytes. In a study comparing immune cell proliferation after shock in mice who have had and haven’t had their splenic nerve cut, it was found that stress levels in the spleen are controlled by norepinephrine released by the splenic nerve. By cutting the splenic nerve and thus depleting the norepinephrine release, researchers mimicked a high-stress environment and found a large proliferation of splenocytes, proving that stress plays an important role in their immune response. When stress is introduced, the immunosuppressive properties of the associated hormones lead to a decline in immune function, making animals more susceptible to bacterial and viral infections.
