= Spleen transplantation =

Transfer of spleen or its fragments from one individual to another

- ICD-9-CM: 41.94

Spleen transplantation is the transfer of spleen or its fragments from one individual to another. It is under research for induction of immunological tolerance for other transplanted organs. Success has been achieved in rodent models. Recently, evidence has been obtained for a tolerogenic effect of a spleen transplant in miniature swine. Also, the spleen harbors primitive hematopoietic progenitor cells. Spleen transplantation has been performed on humans with mixed results.

== Autotransplantation ==
Splenic tissue can be deliberately autotransplanted after splenectomy, as some tissue will still be viable, to attempt to preserve some splenic function (with the goal of preventing OPSI). Usually this involves leaving parts of splenic parenchyma in pouches of omentum. This is not without risk or complication. This was performed after splenosis was understood; splenosis is the spontaneous reimplantation of splenic tissue elsewhere in the body (usually the abdomen) after it has broken off from the spleen due to trauma or surgery.

According to a 2020 review of 18 experimental studies, the transplanted spleen appears functional, with 95% of re-implanted tissue undergoing regeneration (by scintigraphy) and 90% of patients having a normalized blood film (suggesting functional blood filtration). All studies also report restoration of antibody levels. There is insufficient evidence to draw conclusions about OPSI rates. Of patients, 3.7% suffer from complications.

== See also ==
- Accessory spleen – Small nodule found apart from the main body of the spleen
- Polysplenia – Developmental failure in spleen formation
- Splenectomy – Surgical removal of the spleen
