= Splenogonadal fusion-limb defects-micrognathia syndrome =

- Other names: SGFLD syndrome
- Specialty: Medical genetics
- Symptoms: Spleen-gonad fusion, limb defects, orofacial anomalies, and endocrine failure
- Complications: Premature death
- Usual onset: Birth
- Duration: Lifelong (although life is generally short for most people with the condition)
- Causes: Genetic mutation
- Differential diagnosis: Hanhart syndrome
- Prevention: None
- Prognosis: Poor
- Frequency: About 30 cases have been described in medical literature
- Deaths: 9

Splenogonadal fusion-limb defects-micrognathia syndrome, also known by its abbreviation, SGFLD syndrome, is a rare genetic disorder characterized by abnormal fusion of the spleen and the gonad (splenogonadal fusion) alongside limb defects and orofacial anomalies. It is a type of syndromic dysostosis.

Children with the condition typically have abnormal fusion of the spleen and the gonad, amelia (or any kind of severe shortening of a limb), microglossia, cleft palate, bifid uvula, micrognathia. Additional symptoms include cryptorchidism, anal stenosis, anal atresia, pulmonary hypoplasia, and congenital heart defects.

The condition is highly fatal; fetuses and children with this condition are more likely to either be stillborn or die in infancy.

The condition is congenital, although an exact inheritance pattern is unknown. Online Mendelian Inheritance in Man (OMIM) proposes it to be autosomal dominant.

Around 30 cases of SGFLD have been described in medical literature. Most of them were male.
