= Ludwig Wullstein =

German surgeon (1864–1930)

Ludwig Wullstein (22 April 1864, Leopoldshall - 11 October 1930, Essen) was a German surgeon.

Wullstein studied medicine in Leipzig, Würzburg and Berlin, attaining the title of professor in 1908. From 1888 he was a member of the Corps Rhenania Würzburg. In 1913 he was appointed chief physician at the "Bergmannsheil" (a miner's hospital) in Bochum.

At the turn of the century, Wullstein demonstrated a method of treatment for scoliosis by "forcible correction", achieving positive results in experiments with scoliotic dogs. His technique involved the use of plaster of Paris jackets administered to the patient in an improved position, and influenced by applying considerable traction and lateral pressure.

== Writings ==
With surgeon Max Wilms (1867-1918), he published Lehrbuch der Chirurgie (1908-1909; 7th edition- 1923), a textbook of surgery that was translated into several different languages. Other noted written works by Wullstein are:

- Die Skoliose in ihrer Behandlung und Entstehung nach klinischen und experimentellen Studien, 1902 - Scoliosis: treatment and evolution by clinical studies and experimentation.
- Bauchdecken, Leber, Milz, Pankreas, Magen, Darm, Hernien, Harn- und Geschlechtsorgane und Becken, 1910 - Abdominal wall, liver, spleen, pancreas, stomach, intestines, hernia, urinary and reproductive organs, and pelvis.
