= Trabecular veins =

Veins inside the spleen

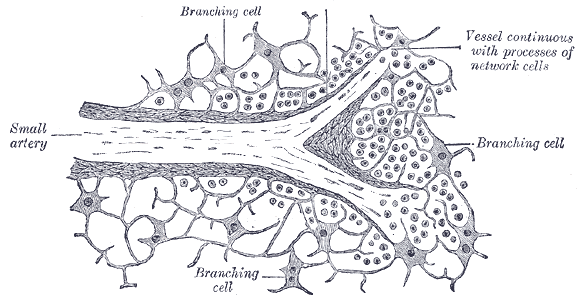
- Section of the spleen, showing the termination of the small blood vessels.

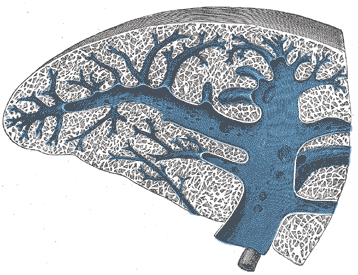
- Transverse section of the spleen, showing the trabecular tissue, the splenic vein and its tributaries.

Details
- Drains from: sinuses of red pulp
- Drains to: Splenic vein
- Artery: Trabecular arteries

The trabecular veins are the largest veins inside the spleen. They drain the blood collected in the sinuses of the pulp.

== Details ==
The blood is collected from the interstices of the splenic tissue by the rootlets of the veins, which begin much in the same way as the arteries end.

The connective-tissue corpuscles of the pulp arrange themselves in rows, in such a way as to form an elongated space or sinus.

They become elongated and spindle-shaped, and overlap each other at their extremities, and thus form a sort of endothelial lining of the path or sinus, which is the radicle of a vein.

On the outer surfaces of these cells are seen delicate transverse lines or markings, which are due to minute elastic fibrils arranged in a circular manner around the sinus.

Thus the channel obtains an external investment, and gradually becomes converted into a small vein, which after a short course acquires a coat of ordinary connective tissue, lined by a layer of flattened epithelial cells which are continuous with the supporting cells of the pulp.

The smaller veins unite to form larger veins that do not accompany the arteries, but soon enter the trabecular sheaths of the capsule, and by their junction form six or more branches, which emerge from the splenic hilum, and, uniting, constitute the splenic vein, the largest radicle of the portal vein.
