= Compensation (cytometry) =

In cytometry, compensation is a mathematical correction of a signal overlap between the channels of the emission spectra of different fluorochromes.

The photons emitted by fluorochromes have different energies and wavelengths and as flow cytometers use photomultiplier tubes (PMT) in order to convert the photons into electrons, the detector can register the signal from more than one fluorochrome. This creates a signal overlap (spillover) which cannot be removed by the optical system and has to be corrected mathematically. The compensation can be done through different flow cytometry software such as Flowjo, Flowlogic, Kaluza etc. The first data compensation was done in 1977 by Michael Loken et al. during a two colour experiment, where mouse splenocytes were stained with fluorescein and rhodamine.

== Spillover ==
When one cell is marked by two or more fluorochromes, the added brightness of one fluorochrome to the other creates significant background noise and affects the strength of the signal. This is called a spillover. The physical overlap between the different emission spectra of fluorochromes can activate different receptors than the ones intended for the given wavelength. The ability to correct this stems from the fact, that the overlap is a linear function, so the measured signal can be averaged and thus corrected. This correction is called compensation.

Compensation is necessary in order to be able to differentiate between populations of cells. This is done by measuring the spectral overlap of the different fluorochromes and using the measured values to create a matrix. The matrix is then inverted and gives the actual compensation values. The flow cytometer then uses these values to correct the overlap in each detector for each colour.
