= Splenogonadal fusion =

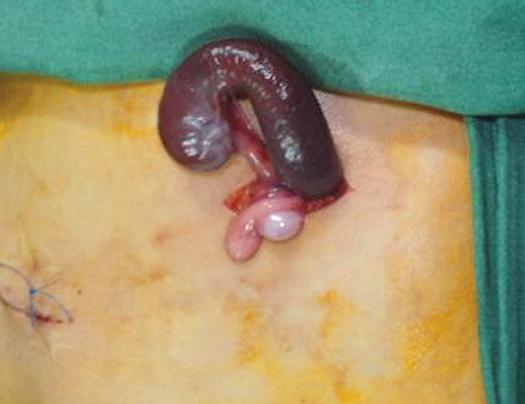
- Intra-operative gross photograph of the spleen attached to the left testis in a 1-year old boy with splenogonadal fusion

Splenogonadal fusion is a rare congenital malformation that results from an abnormal connection between the primitive spleen and gonad during gestation. A portion of the splenic tissue then descends with the gonad. Splenogonadal fusion has been classified into two types: continuous, where there remains a connection between the main spleen and gonad; and discontinuous, where ectopic splenic tissue is attached to the gonad, but there is no connection to the orthotopic spleen. Patients can also have an accessory spleen. Patients with continuous splenogonadal fusion frequently have additional congenital abnormalities including limb defects, micrognathia, skull anomalies, Spina bifida, cardiac defects, anorectal abnormalities, and most commonly cryptorchidism. Terminal limb defects have been documented in at least 25 cases which makes up a separate diagnosis of splenogonadal fusion limb defect (SGFLD) syndrome.

The anomaly was first described in 1883 by Bostroem. Since then more than 150 cases of splenogonadal fusion have been documented, predominantly in males. The condition is considered benign. A few cases of testicular neoplasm have been reported in association with splenogonadal fusion. The reported cases have occurred in patients with a history of cryptorchidism, which is associated with an elevated risk of neoplasm.

Splenogonadal fusion occurs with a male-to-female ratio of 16:1, and is seen nearly exclusively on the left side. The condition remains a diagnostic challenge, but preoperative consideration of the diagnosis and use of ultrasound may help avoid unnecessary orchiectomy. The presence of splenic tissue may be confirmed with a technetium-99m sulfur colloid scan.

== Classification ==
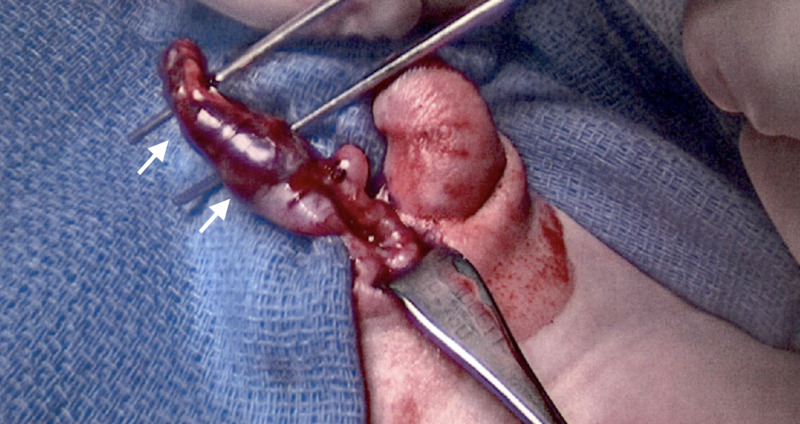
Left testis in scrotal position with adherent accessory spleen.

Splenogonadal fusion is separated into two types:

- Continuous (55%): The native spleen is connected to the gonad. The connection occurs through a cord of splenic tissue or fibrous band.
- Discontinuous (45%): Ectopic splenic tissue is present and attached to the gonad. An accessory spleen is present and the native spleen lacks the direct attachment to the gonad.

| | Continuous | Discontinuous |
|---|---|---|
| Frequency | 55% | 45% |
| Associated malformations | Common | Uncommon |
| Imaging | Possible visualization of connecting cord between native spleen and gonad | No identifiable link between native spleen and gonad |
| Technetium-99m Scintigraphy | Radioactive tracer uptake in mass equivalent to uptake in normal splenic tissue | Radioactive tracer uptake in mass equivalent to uptake in normal splenic tissue |

== Pathogenesis ==
The cause of splenogonadal fusion is still unclear, and there are several proposed mechanisms. A developmental field defect that occurs during blastogenesis is the current explanation of pathogenesis. The spleen derives from mesenchymal tissue and an inappropriate fusion can happen between the gonadal ridge during gut rotation, which occurs between weeks 5 and 8 of fetal life. Splenogonadal fusion may result from an unknown teratogenic insult. The timing of this insult may correlate to the severity of associated defects. There is also postulation that fusion may occur due to adhesion after an inflammatory response or a lack of apoptosis between the structures. Siblings documented to have splenogonadal fusion and an accessory spleen provides additional evidence of a possible genetic component.

=== Associated Conditions ===
Additional congenital abnormalities are most often found associated with the continuous type of splenogonadal fusion. These abnormalities include micrognathia, macroglossia, anal atresia, and pulmonary hypoplasia. The most commonly associated malformation is cryptorchidism. When limb abnormalities occur, Splenogonadal Fusion with Limb Defects is made as a separate diagnosis. Splenogonadal Fusion with Limb Defects is also of unknown cause but some literature suggests that the condition may be related to Hanhart syndrome and facial femoral syndrome. Splenogonadal fusion has also been identified in infants with Möbius syndrome and Poland syndrome.

== Diagnosis ==
Diagnosis can be challenging pre-operatively, as patients are commonly asymptomatic. Physical examination can aid in diagnosis if the mass is palpated, but further confirmatory tests are necessary. Females are reportedly less affected by splenogonadal fusion, though it is possible that the condition is underdiagnosed due to the difficulty of internal gonad examination in females. On scrotal ultrasound, ectopic splenic tissue may appear as an encapsulated homogeneous extratesticular mass, isoechoic with the normal testis. Subtle hypoechoic nodules may be present in the mass. Limitations of doppler ultrasonography include visualizing the nonspecific paratesticular masses which can mimic malignancies such as rhabdomyosarcoma or embryonal sarcoma. Technetium-99m sulfur colloid scan is sensitive to target the liver, spleen, and bone marrow, therefore the scans can be used to identify ectopic splenic tissue when clinical suspicion is high. When technetium-99m sulfur colloid scans are not included in a patient's diagnostic workup, the diagnosis is often not made until the surgeon performs an abdominal exploration using laparoscopy which can visualize the splenic tissue grossly. Evaluation by biopsy including frozen section procedure is confirmatory for splenogonadal fusion. Histological examination will show normal splenic tissue which is made up of red and white pulp. Many people with splenogonadal fusion go undiagnosed without complication during their lifetime. Many cases have been diagnosed at autopsy or incidentally after orchiectomy.

== Treatment ==
Treatment remains controversial given the benign nature of splenogonadal fusion. Splenogonadal fusion does not have known clinical manifestations that require intervention. Clinical observation is considered when the mass is diagnosed pre-operatively. Surgery is often required to confirm the diagnosis and exclude a mimic of a malignant mass. Surgical approach should attempt to divide the mass and the gonad at the connecting plane for removal of the splenic tissue. Orchiectomy is generally not indicated. Causality between splenogonadal fusion and future malignant transformation has not been established, but literature has highlighted infrequent cases of testicular neoplasms and splenogonadal fusion. These cases were found in patients who also had a history of cryptorchidism, which is a known risk factor for testicular cancer.

== See also ==
- Splenogonadal fusion-limb defects-micrognathia syndrome
