= Haemal node =

Lymphoid organ similar to the spleen and lymph nodes

Hemal nodes (haemel nodes in British English), also known as hemolymph nodes (haemolymph nodes) or splenolymph nodes, are lymphoid organs found in various mammals (especially prominent in ruminants) and some birds. Hemal nodes were first described by Gibbes in 1884. Hemal nodes appear similar to lymph nodes in the structure of its lymphoid follicles and to the spleen in the structure in its lymphoid cords. It is presumed to have the same function as the spleen.
