= Theodor von Dusch =

German physician

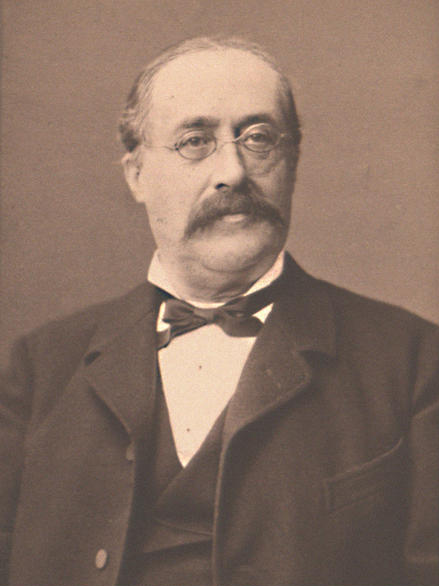
- Theodor von Dusch
- Born: September 17, 1824; Karlsruhe, Grand Duchy of Baden
- Died: January 13, 1890 (aged 65); Heidelberg, German Empire
- Education: University of Heidelberg
- Occupation: Physician
- Known for: Cotton-wool air filtration; works on thrombosis and heart disease
- Parent: Alexander von Dusch (father)

Theodor von Dusch (17 September 1824 – 13 January 1890) was a German medical doctor who was a native of Karlsruhe. He was the son of Baden statesman Alexander von Dusch (1789-1876).

He studied medicine at the University of Heidelberg, where he had as instructors Jacob Henle (1809-1895), Karl von Pfeufer (1806-1869) and Maximilian Joseph von Chelius (1794-1876). He earned his doctorate in 1847, and was habilitated for medicine in 1854. In 1870 he became professor and director of the policlinic at Heidelberg.

In the 1850s, with Heinrich G. F. Schröder (1810-1885), he demonstrated that a filter made of cotton-wool was effective in removing microbes such as bacteria from air. Dusch was the author of influential works involving thrombosis of cerebral sinuses ("On thrombosis of the cerebral sinuses"; translated into English in 1861), heart disease ("Lehrbuch der Herzkrankheiten") and diseases of the endocardium and myocardium ("Die Krankheiten des Myocardium" and "Die Krankheiten des Endocardium"). The latter works were included in Carl Gerhardt's "Handbuch der Kinderkrankheiten" (Textbook of Childhood Diseases).
