= Heinrich G. F. Schröder =

German mathematician and physicist (1810–1885)

Heinrich Georg Friedrich Schröder (28 September 1810 – 12 May 1885) was a German natural scientist (physicist, chemist), mathematician and educator.

Together with Theodor von Dusch, he was credited with the development of a method of air sterilization by filtration through cotton, used for food preservation (1853).

In 1858, he published a sketch about an optical illusion which now bears his name.
