= Karl von Pfeufer =

German physician (1806–1869)

Karl Sebastian von Pfeufer
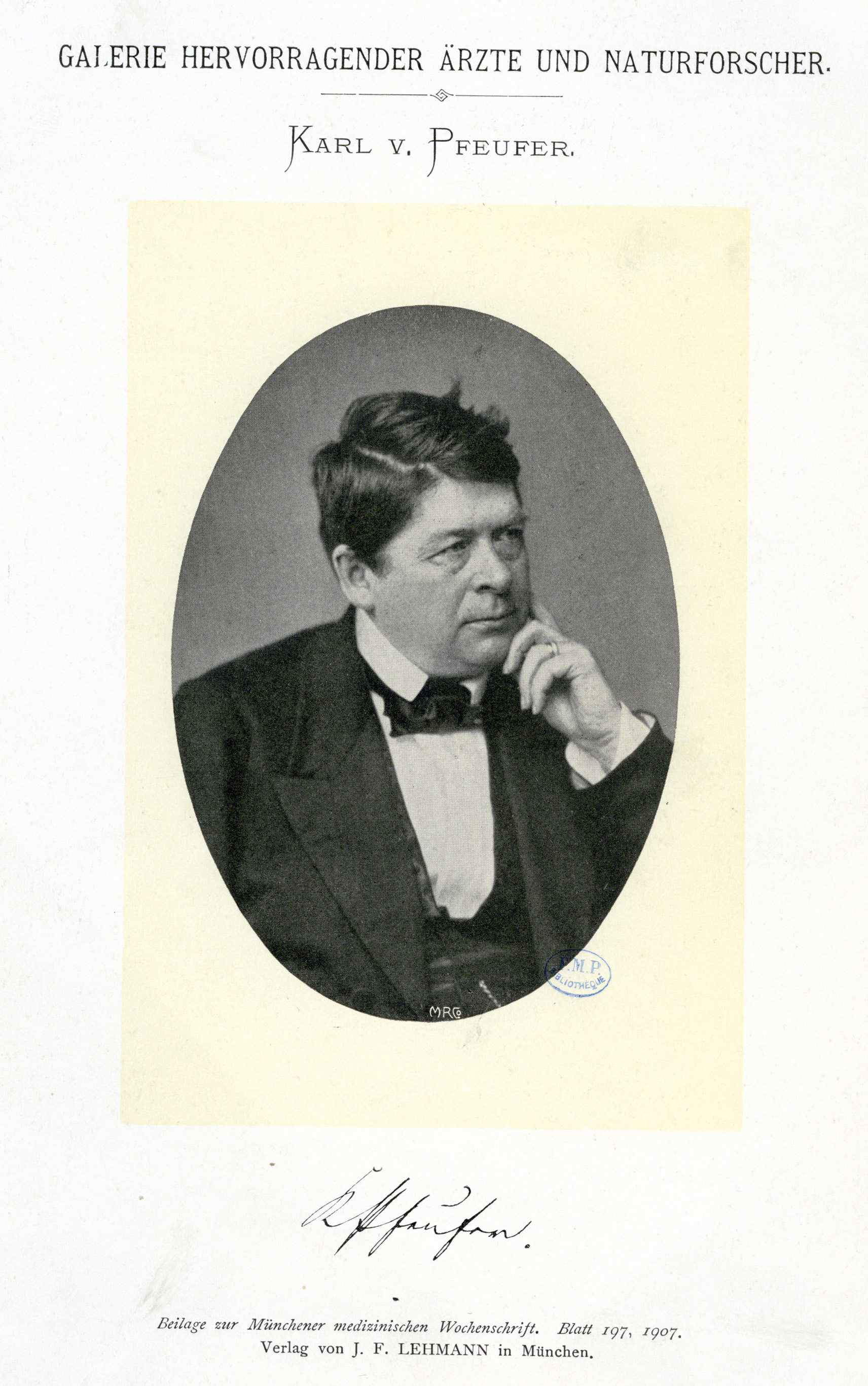
- Karl von Pfeufer
- Born: 22 December 1806
- Died: 13 September 1869 (aged 62)
- Occupation: Physician

Karl Sebastian von Pfeufer (22 December 1806 – 13 September 1869) was a German medical doctor who was a native of Bamberg.

He studied at Erlangen and Würzburg, and afterwards served as an assistant to Johann Lukas Schönlein (1793–1864). In 1840 he became a professor and director at the medical clinic in Zurich, and from 1844 worked at the university clinic in Heidelberg. In 1852 he was named clinical professor in the second medical division at the general hospital in Munich. Some of his better known students and assistants were Friedrich Albert von Zenker (1825–1898), Adolf Kussmaul (1822–1902), Theodor von Dusch (1824-1890) and Otto Leichtenstern (1845–1900).

Karl Pfeufer is remembered for his collaboration with anatomist Friedrich Gustav Jacob Henle (1809–1885), an association that began in the early 1840s at Zurich. The two doctors are credited as forerunners of German scientific medicine, and were pioneers in their attempts to create a synthesis between laboratory and clinic. In 1844 they founded a journal on "rational medicine" called Zeitschrift für rationelle Medizin, which was to become one of the more important medical journals in the German language. Pfeufer would maintain written correspondence with Henle until his death in 1869.

Another publication by Pfeufer was an 1837 treatise on the cholera epidemic at Mittenwald, titled Bericht über die Cholera-Epidemie in Mittenwald.

== Works about Karl von Pfeufer ==
- Der Briefwechsel zwischen Jakob Henle und Karl Pfeufer, 1843-1890, edited and revised by Hermann Hoepke. (Sudhoffs archive supplements, Issue 11.) Wiesbaden: Steiner, 1970 - The correspondence between Jakob Henle and Karl Pfeufer 1843–1869.

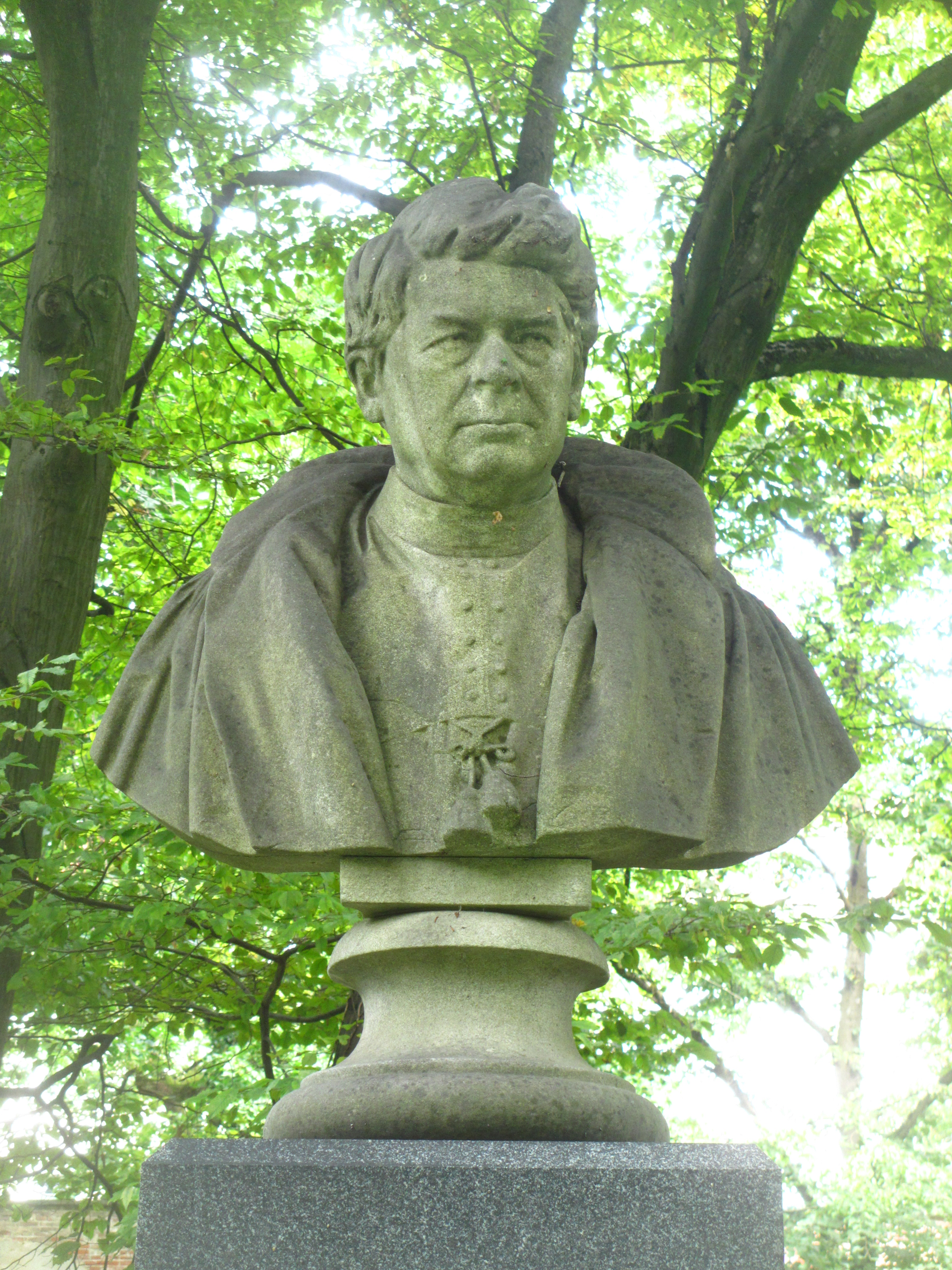
Bust of Karl Pfeufer at the Alter Südfriedhof in Munich
