= Cords of Billroth =

Connective tissue in the spleen

Identifiers
- FMA: 16031

The cords of Billroth (also known as splenic cords or red pulp cords) are found in the red pulp of the spleen between the sinusoids, consisting of fibrils and connective tissue cells with a large population of monocytes and macrophages. These cords contain half of the human body's monocytes as a reserve so that, after tissue injury, these monocytes can move in and aid locally sourced monocytes in wound healing.

Erythrocytes pass through the cords of Billroth before entering the sinusoids. The passage into the sinusoids may be seen as a bottleneck, where erythrocytes need to be flexible in order to pass through. In disorders of erythrocyte shape and/or flexibility, such as hereditary spherocytosis, erythrocytes fail to pass through and get phagocytosed, causing extravascular hemolysis.

== Eponym ==
They are named for Theodor Billroth, Austrian surgeon.
