= Periarteriolar lymphoid sheaths =

Cell layer around splenic arterioles

Periarteriolar lymphoid sheaths (or periarterial lymphatic sheaths, or PALS) are a portion of the white pulp of the spleen. They are populated largely by T cells and surround central arteries within the spleen; the PALS T-cells are presented with blood borne antigens via myeloid dendritic cells.

In contrast, the lymphoid portions of the white pulp are dominated by B cells.
