= Splenosis =

Splenosis is the result of spleen tissue breaking off the main organ and implanting at another site inside the body. This is called heterotopic autotransplantation of the spleen. It most commonly occurs as a result of traumatic splenic rupture or abdominal surgery. Depending on the location of the spleen, the new piece usually implants in another part of the abdominal cavity (including the pelvic cavity). Single case reports also describe splenosis in the thoracic cavity, in subcutaneous tissue, in the liver or in the cranial cavity. Splenosis must be distinguished from the presence of additional spleens, which are innate and are the result of differences in embryological development. Additionally, splenosis must be differentiated from malignant tumors which may look similar when imaged.

== History ==
Ectopic splenic tissue was first described in 1896 by Albrecht in Germany, whereas the term "splenosis" was first used by Buchbinder and Lipkoffin to describe their findings in 1939.

== Cause ==
A necessary requirement for splenosis is the rupture of the spleen, through a traumatic injury (such as a car wreck) or abdominal surgery, especially splenectomy. Splenosis in the abdominal category may occur in up to 65% of traumatic ruptures of the spleen. Splenosis in the thoracic cavity is rarer, because it requires the simultaneous rupture of the diaphragm. The implantation of spleen tissue under the skin may result from abdominal surgery or gunshot wounds. Splenosis of the brain or liver is hypothesized to be the result of tiny pieces of spleen tissue traveling through the bloodstream.

== Pathology ==
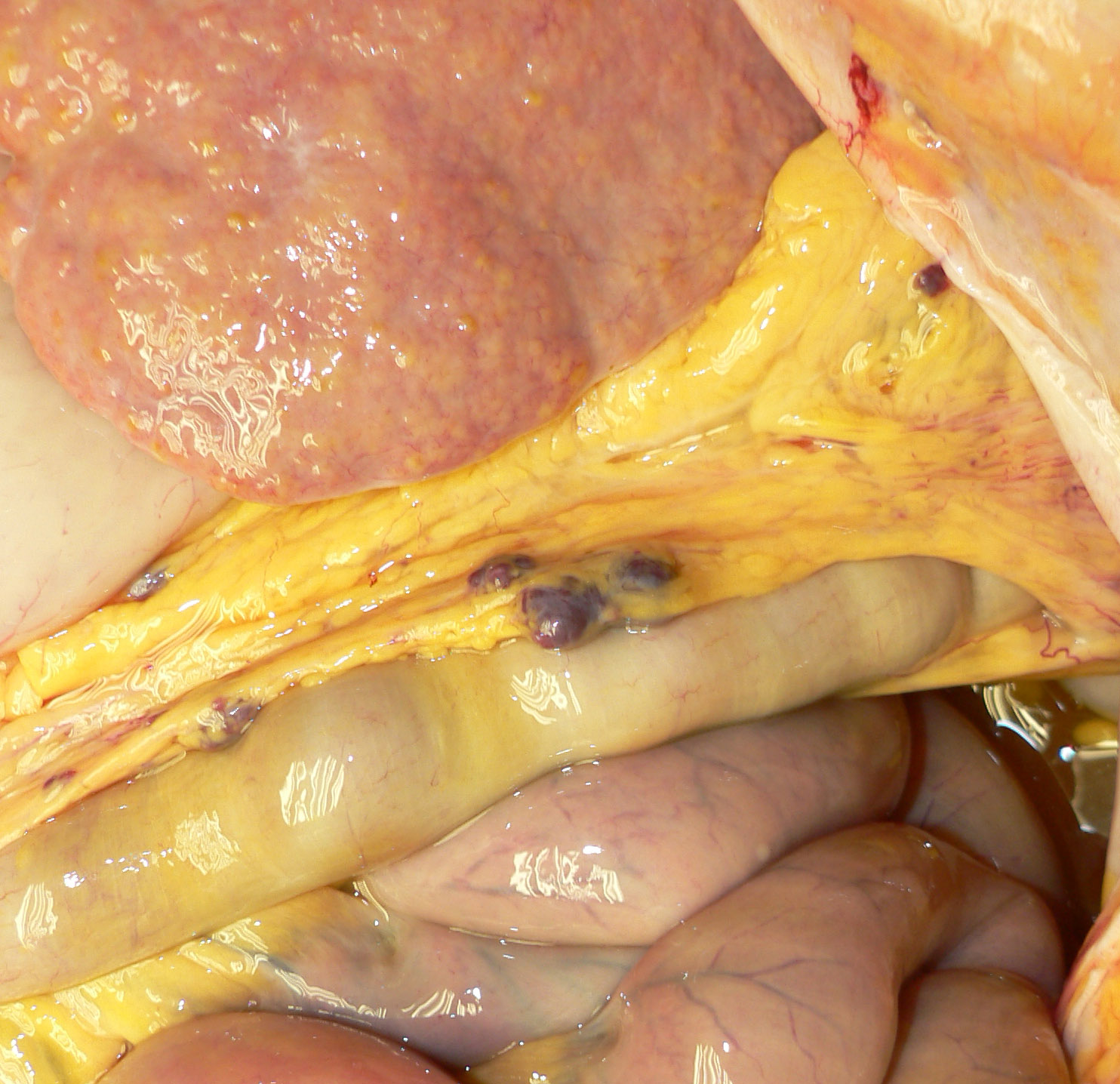
Several implants of splenic tissue have implanted in the soft tissue of the left upper abdomen. The person had experienced splenic rupture during a car wreck and subsequent surgical removal of the spleen four years before this photo was taken.

Macroscopically, splenosis manifests as individual pieces of reddish-blue tissue with variable shape, which can be as few as one and as many as 300, mostly in the abdominal cavity, and varying in size from a few millimeters to as large as 12 cm. Due to the limited blood supply to these nodules, the typical size of splenic implants is usually less than 3 cm. The implants can be separate pieces or connect to other pieces of splenic tissue by a thin stem. Histologically, the regular spleen tissue is made up of red and white pulp, similar to the structure of an accessory spleen.

== Clinical presentation ==
About a decade commonly passes between the injury and the discovery of splenosis. As little as five months and as much as 32 years have been reported. Most people with splenosis have no symptoms, so the splenosis is discovered by chance through screening or in the process of diagnosing another disease. Some people experience symptoms, such as abdominal pain, intestinal obstruction, hemorrhage, or hydronephrosis. Tissue infarction due to limited blood supply can be a cause of symptomatic splenosis. Symptoms of splenosis affecting the thoracic cavity sometimes include hemoptysis or pleurisy.

== Diagnosis ==
A definitive diagnosis is often made through biopsy and histological examination of the tissue by a pathologist. Multiple implants of splenic tissue can mimic the appearance of some cancerous conditions. This can be clarified through diagnostic imaging (for example, ultrasound, CT scan, and MRI).

In particular, splenosis is differentiated from different forms of lymphoma, metastisized cancers, cancer of the abdomen and pleural tissues, primary kidney or liver tumors, endometriosis or non-cancerous swollen lymph nodes.

== Treatment ==
Treatment of splenosis is often unnecessary, because it is benign and usually asymptomatic. For people experiencing symptoms, the splenic tissue can be removed by surgery.

== Epidemiology ==
Splenosis is slightly more common in males than females, probably due to the greater frequency of physical trauma experienced by men.

== See also ==
- Polysplenia
