= Otto Michael Ludwig Leichtenstern =

German internist

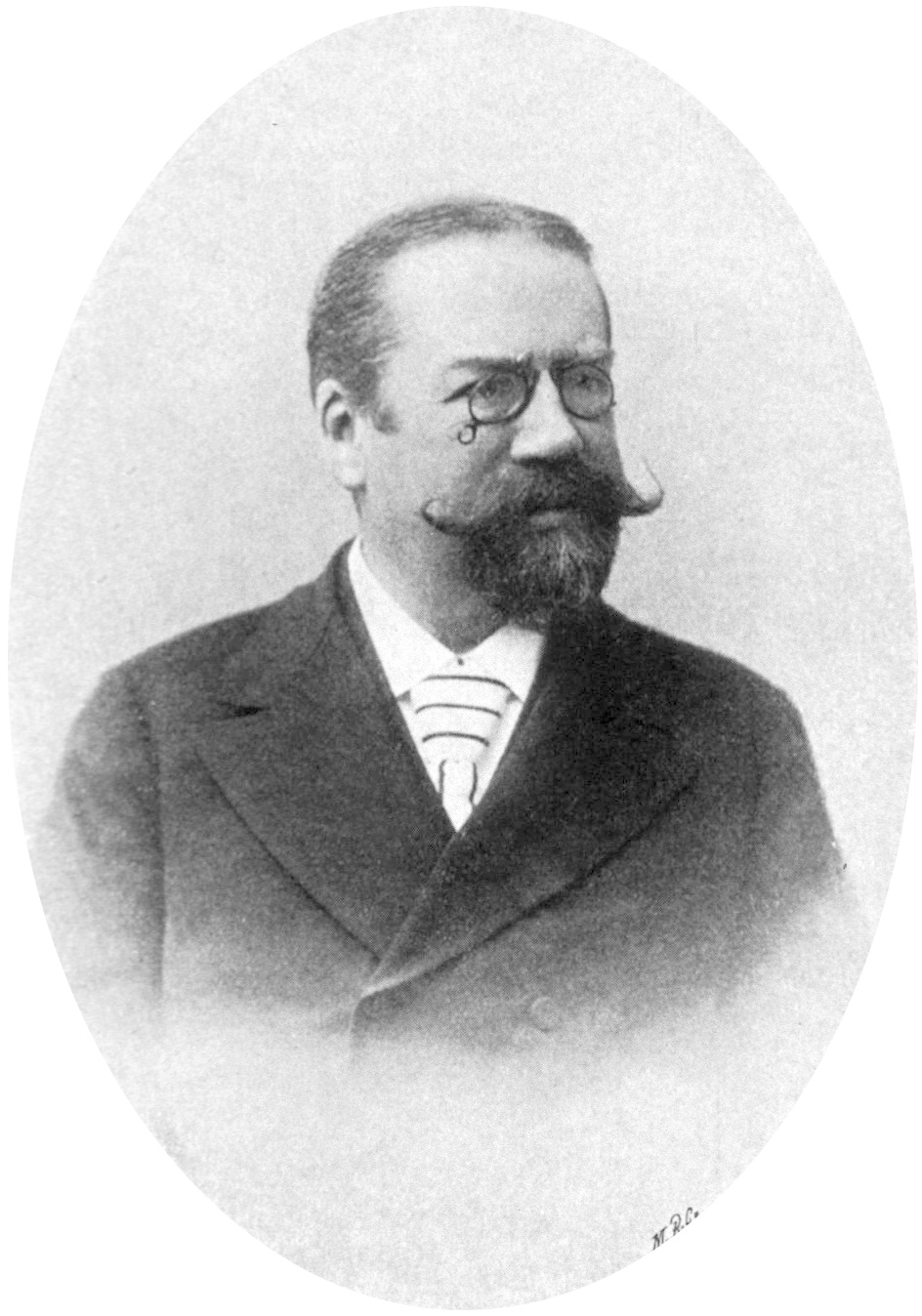
- Born: October 14, 1845; Ingolstadt, Kingdom of Bavaria
- Died: February 23, 1900 (aged 54); Cologne, German Empire
- Education: Ludwig-Maximilians-Universität München
- Known for: Identifying Strümpell-Leichtenstern encephalitis

Otto Michael Ludwig Leichtenstern (14 October 1845 – 23 February 1900) was a German internist born in Ingolstadt.

In 1869, he received his doctorate from the Ludwig-Maximilians-Universität München, later working as an assistant of clinical medicine at the Ludwig-Maximilians-Universität München under Karl von Pfeufer (1806–1869) and Joseph von Lindwurm (1824–1874). After the death of Felix von Niemeyer (1820–1871), he served as interim head of the medical clinic at the University of Tübingen prior to the appointment of Carl von Liebermeister (1833–1901) as Niemeyer's permanent replacement. Leichtenstern remained at the Tübingen hospital for several years, afterwards serving as head physician of internal medicine at the city hospital in Cologne (1879–1900).

Leichtenstern is remembered for publishing articles on almost every facet of medicine. In the field of helminthology, he made contributions in his investigations of hookworm (Ancylostoma duodenale).

In 1898, he suspected that the compound 2-naphthylamine (2-NA) was involved in human bladder tumorigenesis. With Adolph Strümpell (1853–1925), the eponymous "Strümpell-Leichtenstern encephalitis" is named, a disease also known as acute hemorrhagic encephalitis.
