= White pulp =

Type of tissue in the spleen

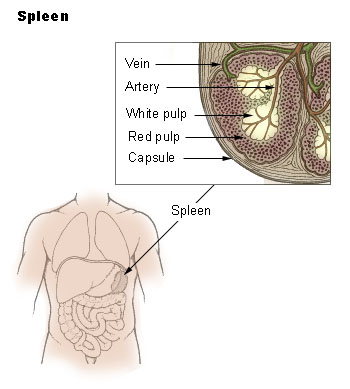
- Spleen

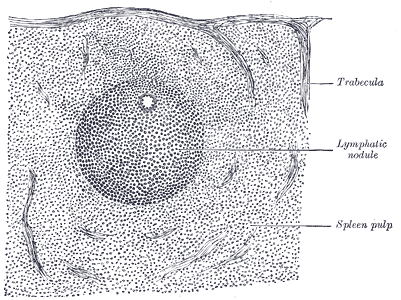
- Transverse section of a portion of the spleen. (Lymphatic nodule labeled at center right.)

Details
- Precursor: mesoderm
- Artery: trabecular artery
- Vein: trabecular vein

Identifiers
- Latin: noduli lymphoidei splenici
- TA98: A13.2.01.006
- TA2: 5176
- FMA: 62805

White pulp is a histological designation for regions of the spleen (named because it appears whiter than the surrounding red pulp on cross section), that encompasses approximately 25% of splenic tissue. White pulp consists entirely of lymphoid tissue.

Specifically, the white pulp encompasses several areas with distinct functions:

- The periarteriolar lymphoid sheaths (PALS) are typically associated with the arteriole supply of the spleen; they contain T lymphocytes.
- Lymph follicles with dividing B lymphocytes are located between the PALS and the marginal zone bordering on the red pulp. IgM and IgG2 are produced in this zone. These molecules play a role in opsonization of extracellular organisms, encapsulated bacteria in particular.
- The marginal zone exists between the white pulp and red pulp. It is located farther away from the central arteriole, in proximity to the red pulp. It contains antigen-presenting cells (APCs), such as dendritic cells and macrophages. Some of the white pulp's macrophages are of a specialized kind known as metallophilic macrophages.

== Macrophages in the white pulp ==
The T cell zone (periarteriolar sheath) and B cell follicles contain discrete macrophage populations; however, not much is known about these macrophage populations in terms of their origin and lifespan. These macrophages are not unique to the spleen but instead make up an integral part of the lymphoid parts of all secondary lymphoid organs.

In the B cell follicles, the macrophages are important in clearing the apoptotic B cells that occur during the germinal centre reaction in the process of somatic hypermutation and isotype switching. B cells that cannot form their appropriate receptors will die of apoptosis and are subsequently cleared by the macrophages in the germinal centre. During intensive germinal centre reactions, this process is obvious due to the presence of the large macrophages in the germinal centre, known as tingible body macrophages, so named because their 'tingible bodies' represent condensed apoptotic nuclei. In order for the apoptotic cells to be taken up by macrophages, it is important that phosphatidylserine is expressed on the outer surface of the apoptotic cells, which is recognized by multiple receptors. The tingible body macrophages express: tyrosine kinase Mer, the milk fat globule epidermal growth factor 8 and Tim-4, all of which supports the engulfment of the apoptotic cells into the macrophages.

Macrophages are also present in the T cell area of the white pulp but their role is less well understood. This population of macrophages can be found in all the other T cell zones of the secondary lymphoid organs. It is possible that these macrophages are descendants of patrolling monocytes that entered the white pulp from the blood. Due to them being positioned alongside T cells, it is suggested that these macrophages have a role in antigen presentation or the removal of dying lymphocytes.

== See also ==
- Lymph node
- Marginal zone
- Mucosa-associated lymphoid tissue
- Spleen
