= Eric Bostrom Three-Decker =

- U.S. National Register of Historic Places
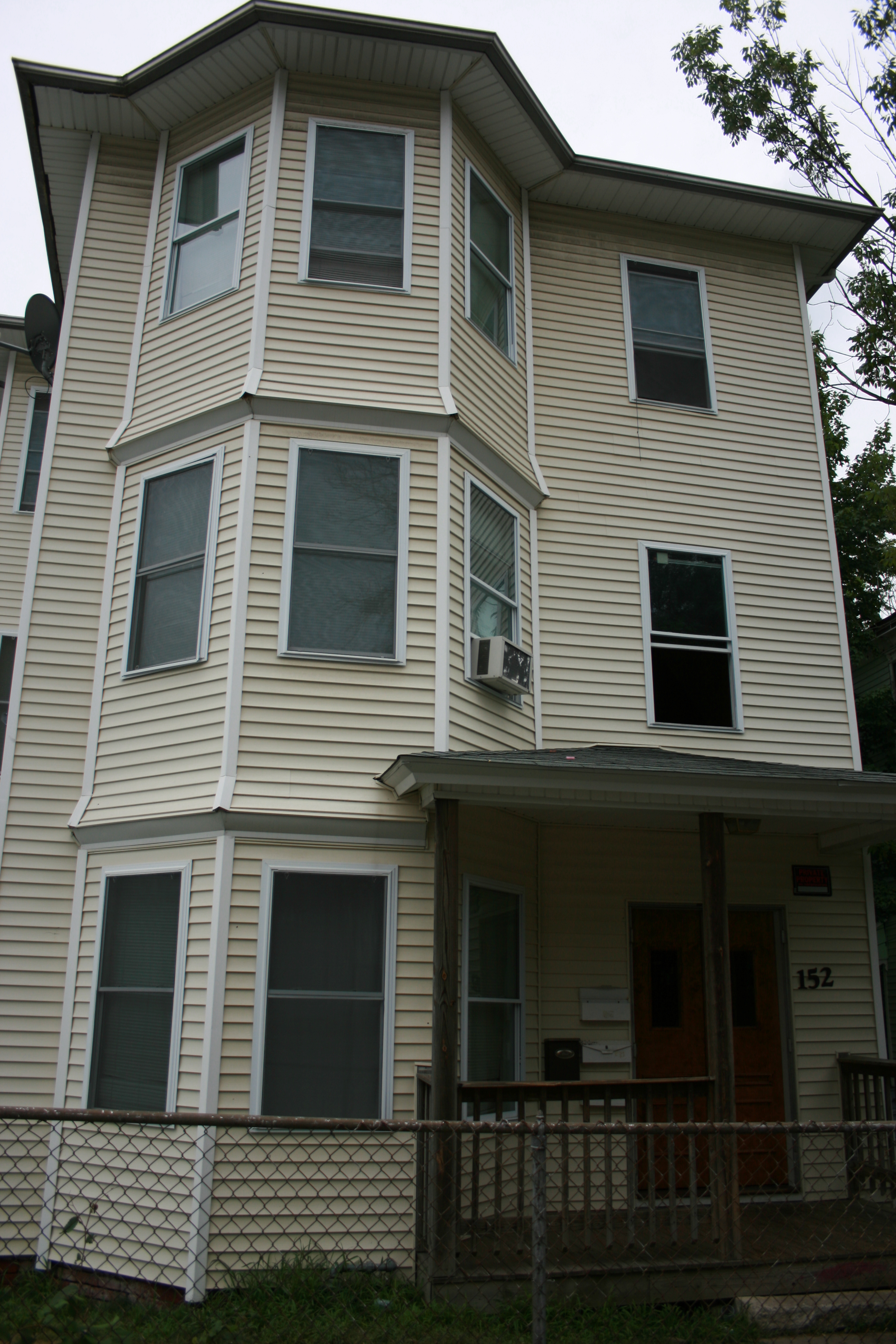

- Location within Massachusetts Location within the United States
- Location: 152 Eastern Ave., Worcester, Massachusetts
- Coordinates: 42°16′26″N 71°47′21″W
- Area: 0.2 acres (0.081 ha)
- Built: 1894
- Architectural style: Queen Anne
- MPS: Worcester Three-Deckers TR
- NRHP reference No.: 89002414
- Added to NRHP: February 9, 1990

The Eric Bostrom Three-Decker is a historic triple decker house in Worcester, Massachusetts, United States. Built about 1894, it was listed on the National Register of Historic Places in 1990 for its elaborate Queen Anne porch woodwork, and eaves with decorative brackets. These features have been lost or obscured by subsequent exterior alterations (see photo).

== Description and history ==
The Eric Bostrom Three-Decker is located in Worcester's eastern Bell Hill neighborhood, on the west side of Eastern Avenue between Belmont and Catharine Streets. It is a three-story wood-frame structure, with a hip roof, rectangular side jog, and exterior finished in synthetic siding. The main facade is asymmetrical, with a three-story polygonal bay on the left, and a single-story porch on the right. The bays have flared skirting, still evident despite the application of siding. The porch, which was ornately decorated with turned posts and balusters, has been replaced by one with a simple hip roof with square posts for support. A porch with similar but less ornate styling and a shed roof used to shelter the back entrance to the building.

The house was built about 1894, when Worcester's Belmont Hill area was rapidly growing with an influx of Scandinavian immigrants. Residents here were typically employed at the North Works of the Washburn and Moen Company. Eric Bostrom, who owned the building into the 1920s, was a machinist; early tenants included a molder, woodworker, wallpaper hangers, and a musician.

== See also ==
- National Register of Historic Places listings in eastern Worcester, Massachusetts
