= Trabeculae of spleen =

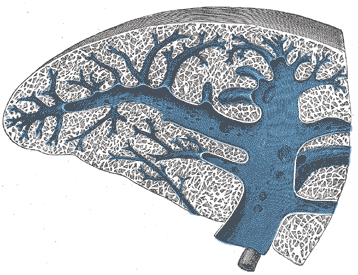
- Transverse section of the spleen, showing the trabecular tissue and the splenic vein and its tributaries

Details

Identifiers
- Latin: trabeculae splenicae
- FMA: 16027

The fibroelastic coat of the spleen invests the organ, and at the hilum is reflected inward upon the vessels in the form of sheaths. From these sheaths, as well as from the inner surface of the fibroelastic coat, numerous small fibrous bands, the trabeculae of the spleen (or splenic trabeculae), emerge from all directions; these uniting, constitute the frame-work of the spleen.

The spleen therefore consists of a number of small spaces or areolae, formed by the trabeculae; in these areolae is contained the splenic pulp.

== See also ==
- Spleen
- Trabecula
