= Accessory spleen =

Small nodule found apart from the main body of the spleen

- Other names: Supernumerary spleen, splenule, splenunculus
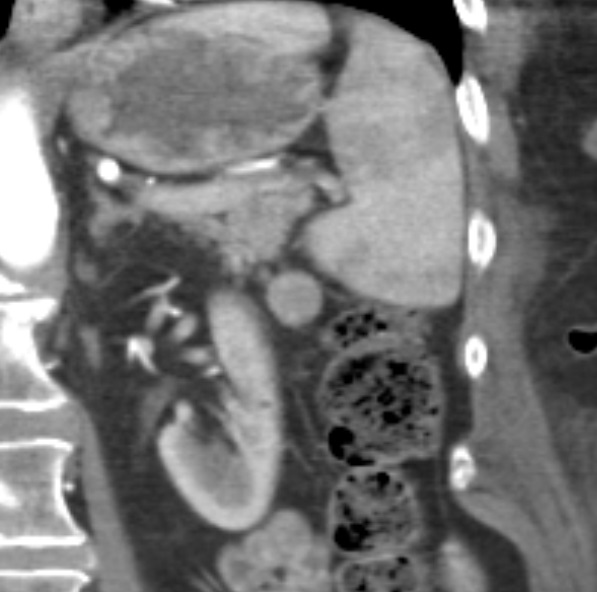
- CT scan of an accessory spleen (circular object in center of image) between the spleen and left kidney
- Specialty: Medical genetics

An accessory spleen is a small nodule of splenic tissue found apart from the main body of the spleen. Accessory spleens are found in approximately 10 percent of the population and are typically around 1 centimeter in diameter. They may resemble a lymph node or a small spleen. They form either by the result of developmental anomalies or trauma. They are medically significant in that they may result in interpretation errors in diagnostic imaging or continued symptoms after therapeutic splenectomy. Polysplenia is the presence of multiple accessory spleens rather than one normal spleen.

== Causes and locations ==
Accessory spleen

Details

Identifiers
- Latin: splen accessorius, lien accessorius
- TA98: A13.2.01.022
- TA2: 5177
- FMA: 16028

Accessory spleens may be formed during embryonic development when some of the cells from the developing spleen are deposited along the path from the midline, where the spleen forms, over to its final location on the left side of the abdomen by the 9th–11th ribs. The most common locations for accessory spleens are the hilum of the spleen and adjacent to the tail of the pancreas. They may be found anywhere along the splenic vessels, in the gastrosplenic ligament, the splenorenal ligament, the walls of the stomach or intestines, the pancreatic tail, the greater omentum, the mesentery, the renal fossa, or the gonads and their path of descent. The typical size is approximately 1 centimeter, but sizes ranging from a few millimeters up to 2–3 centimeters are not uncommon.

Splenogonadal fusion can result in one or more accessory spleens along a path from the abdomen into the pelvis or scrotum. The developing spleen forms near the urogenital ridge from which the gonads develop. The gonads may pick up some tissue from the spleen, and as they descend through the abdomen during development, they can produce either a continuous or a broken line of deposited splenic tissue.

Splenosis is a condition where foci of splenic tissue undergo autotransplantation, most often following physical trauma or splenectomy. Displaced tissue fragments can implant on well vascularized surfaces in the abdominal cavity, or, if the diaphragmatic barrier is broken, the thorax.

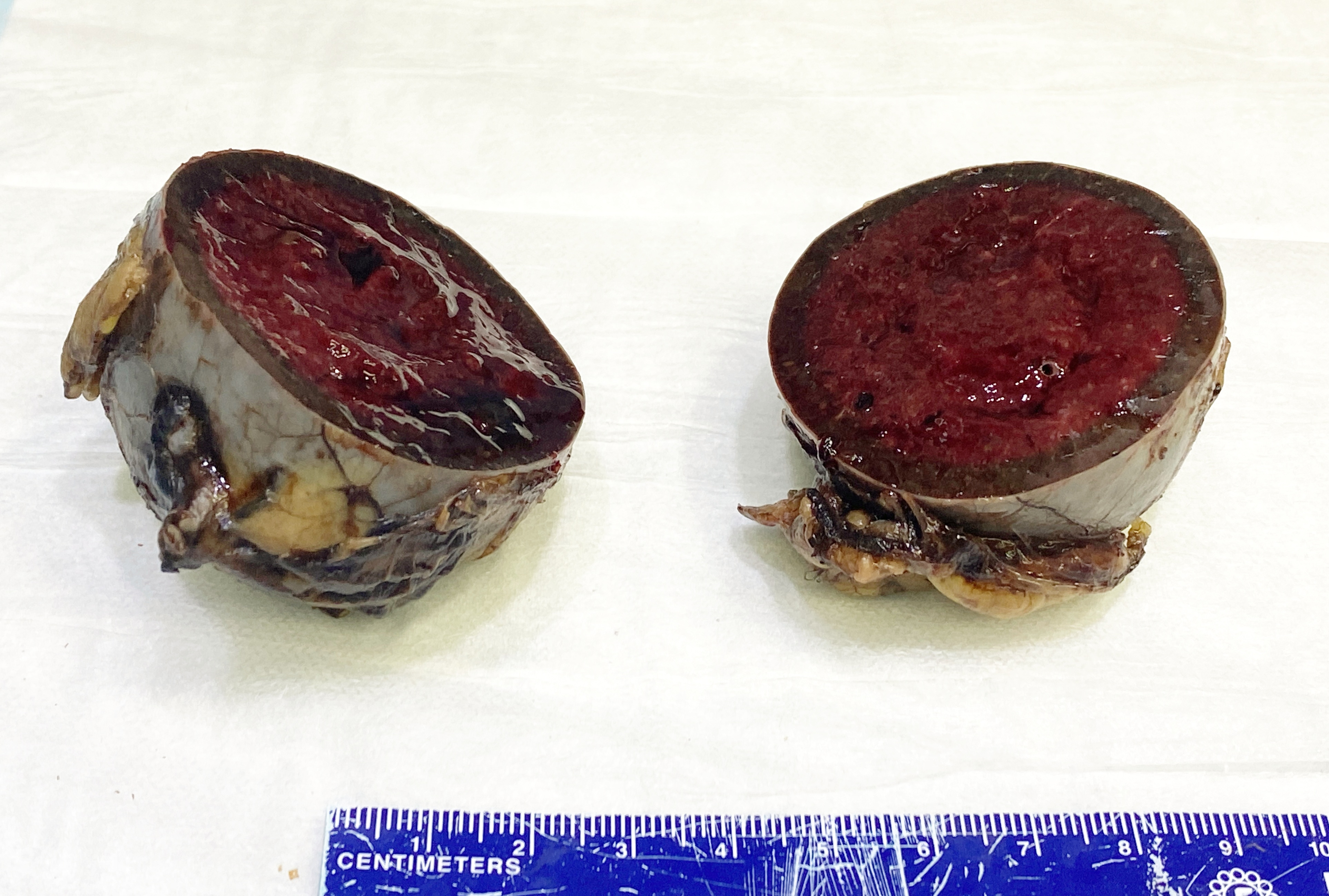
Gross pathology of an accessory spleen

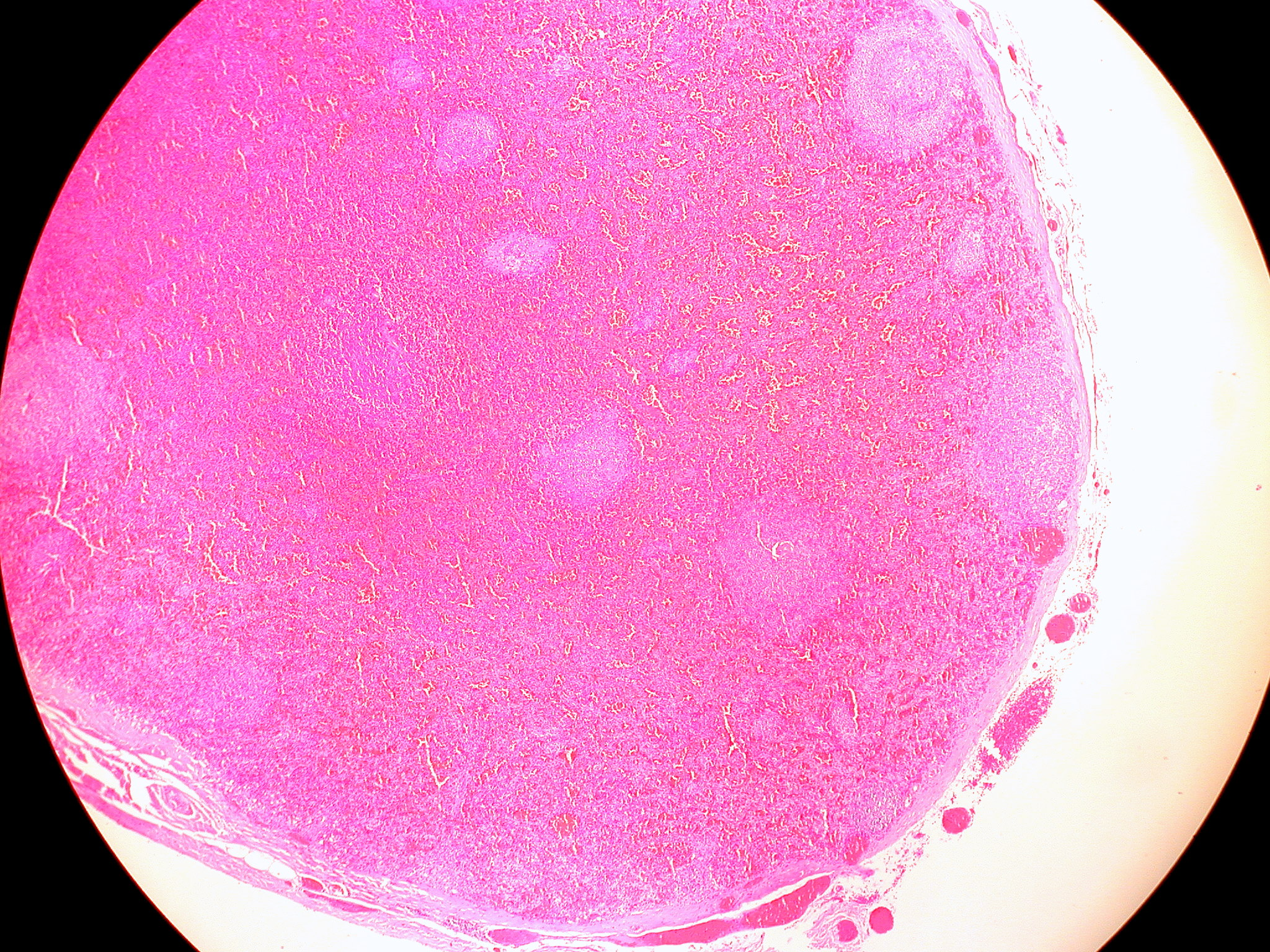
Histologic section of an accessory spleen

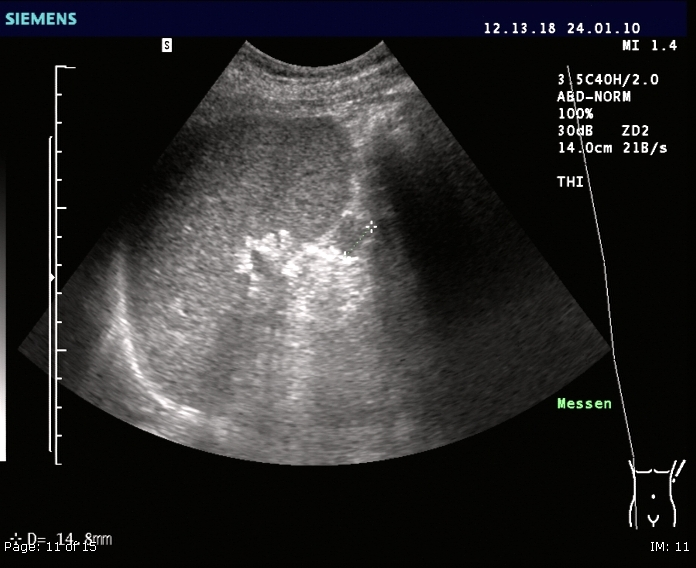
Ultrasonography of an accessory spleen

== Significance ==
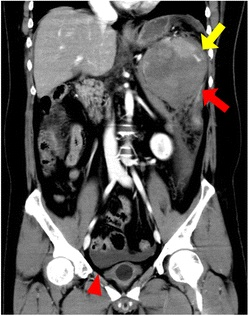
Accessory spleens may undergo hypertrophy after splenectomy Very rarely, it may cause bleeding (pictured).

If splenectomy is performed for conditions in which blood cells are sequestered in the spleen, failure to remove accessory spleens may result in the failure of the condition to resolve. During medical imaging, accessory spleens may be confused for enlarged lymph nodes or neoplastic growth in the tail of the pancreas, gastrointestinal tract, adrenal glands or gonads.
