= 25108 Boström =

Main-belt asteroid

Discovery
- Discovered by: LINEAR
- Discovery site: Lincoln Lab's ETS
- Discovery date: 14 September 1998

Designations
- Named after: Johan Ingemar Boström (ISEF awardee)
- Alternative designations: 1998 RV_{55} · 2000 AW_{242}
- Minor planet category: main-belt · (middle) background

Orbital characteristics
- Epoch 4 September 2017 (JD 2458000.5)
- Uncertainty parameter 0
- Observation arc: 19.82 yr (7,239 days)
- Aphelion: 3.0676 AU
- Perihelion: 2.2032 AU
- Semi-major axis: 2.6354 AU
- Eccentricity: 0.1640
- Orbital period (sidereal): 4.28 yr (1,563 days)
- Mean anomaly: 134.51°
- Mean motion: 0° 13^{m} 49.44^{s} / day
- Inclination: 7.3409°
- Longitude of ascending node: 207.27°
- Argument of perihelion: 183.11°

Physical characteristics
- Mean diameter: 6.812±0.303 km
- Geometric albedo: 0.115±0.013
- Absolute magnitude (H): 14.1

25108 Boström (provisional designation 1998 RV_{55}) is a background asteroid from the central regions of the asteroid belt, approximately 7 kilometers in diameter. It was discovered on 14 September 1998, by astronomers of the Lincoln Near-Earth Asteroid Research at the Lincoln Laboratory's Experimental Test Site near Socorro, New Mexico, United States. The asteroid was named for 2008-ISEF awardee Johan Ingemar Boström.

== Orbit and classification ==
Boström is a non-family from the main belt's background population. It orbits the Sun in the central asteroid belt at a distance of 2.2–3.1 AU once every 4 years and 3 months (1,563 days; semi-major axis of 2.64 AU). Its orbit has an eccentricity of 0.16 and an inclination of 7° with respect to the ecliptic. The body's observation arc begins with a precovery taken by the Near-Earth Asteroid Tracking program at Haleakala Observatory's GEODSS facility in June 1997, or 9 months prior to its official discovery observation.

== Physical characteristics ==
=== Diameter and albedo ===
According to the survey carried out by the NEOWISE mission of NASA's Wide-field Infrared Survey Explorer, Boström measures 6.812 kilometers in diameter and its surface has an intermediate albedo of 0.115.

=== Rotation period ===
As of 2018, no rotational lightcurve of Boström has been obtained from photometric observations. The body's rotation period, pole and shape remain unknown.

This minor planet was named after Swedish student Johan Ingemar Boström (born 1989), one of the two team members in the team project who won second place at the 2008 Intel International Science and Engineering Fair. The official naming citation was published by the Minor Planet Center on 17 September 2008 (M.P.C. 63877).
