= Eugen Enderlen =

German physician and surgeon

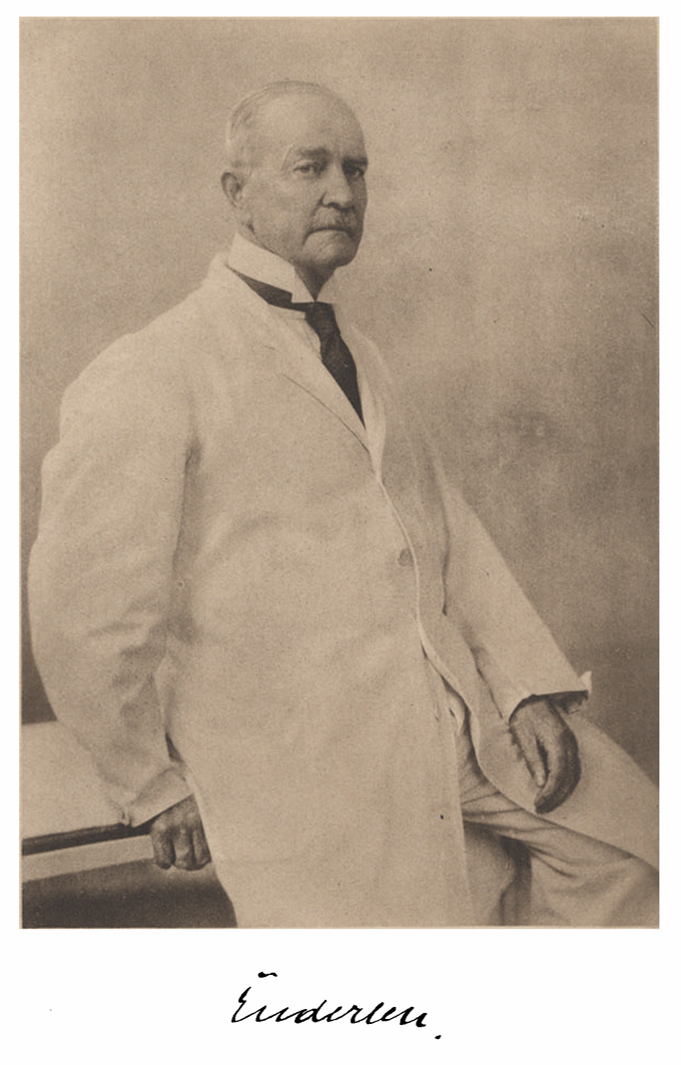
Eugen Enderlen.

Eugen Enderlen (21 January 1863 – 7 June 1940) was a German physician and surgeon born in Salzburg, Austria.

In 1888, he received his medical doctorate from the Ludwig-Maximilians-Universität München, where he worked as an assistant to Hans Ernst August Buchner and Otto Bollinger. In 1895 he obtained his habilitation at the University of Greifswald, and during the following year began work as an assistant to Ernst Küster at Marburg University. In 1899, he became an associate professor, and in 1904 attained the chair of surgery at the University of Basel.

In 1908, he relocated to the University Hospital at the University of Würzburg, and during World War I served as a general physician. In 1918, he was appointed professor of surgery at Heidelberg University. He died in Stuttgart on 7 June 1940, at the age of 77.

Enderlen specialized in numerous surgical procedures, including surgery of the nerves and blood vessels, as well as operations for ulcers and gallstone disorders. He developed innovative techniques in esophageal surgery, and with physiologist Ludolf von Krehl, performed stellate ganglion blocks and denervation operations on the heart. He also conducted experimental research for transplantation of blood vessels, bones and joints, etc.

With Emil Gasser (1847–1919), he was the author of Stereoskopbilder zur Lehre von den Hernien (1906).
