= Eugen Bostroem =

Baltic German pathologist

Eugen Woldemar Bostroem (13 October 1850 – 24 May 1928) was a Baltic German pathologist. He was born in Fellin (now known as Viljandi) in the Livonian Governorate of the Russian Empire (present-day Estonia).

He studied medicine at the universities of Leipzig and Erlangen, receiving his degree in 1876. Afterwards, he was an assistant to Friedrich Albert von Zenker (1825–1898) at the pathology institute in Erlangen. From 1883 to 1926, he was a professor of general pathology and pathological anatomy in Gießen.

In 1890, Bostroem reportedly isolated the causative organism of actinomycosis from a culture of grain, grasses, and soil. Following Bostroem's discovery, there was a general misconception that actinomycosis was a mycosis affecting individuals who chewed grass or straw. The agents of actinomycosis are now known to be endogenous organisms of the mucous membranes, most commonly Actinomyces israelii, a species named after surgeon James Israel, who first discovered its presence in humans in the late 1870s.

In 1883, Bostroem was the first to describe a rare condition known as splenogonadal fusion. Since his discovery, approximately only 150 cases have been documented.

== See also ==
- List of Baltic German scientists

== Selected writings ==
- Beiträge zur pathologischen Anatomie der Nieren (Contributions to the pathological anatomy of the kidneys), Freiburg i.B. and Tübingen, 1884.
- Traumaticismus und Parasitismus als Ursachen der Geschwülste, Gießen, 1902.
- Untersuchungen über die Aktinomykose des Menschen (Investigations on actinomycosis in humans), 1891.
