= Marginal zone =

Part of the spleen

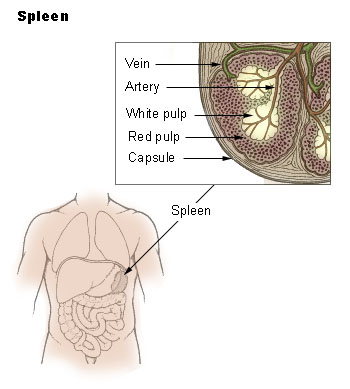

Identifiers
- FMA: 15852

The marginal zone is the region at the interface between the non-lymphoid red pulp and the lymphoid white-pulp of the spleen. (Some sources consider it to be the part of red pulp which borders on the white pulp, while other sources consider it to be neither red pulp nor white pulp.)

A marginal zone also exists in the lymphoid follicles of lymph nodes. Those marginal zones contain naive B cells and memory B cells. In contrast to the marginal zone of the spleen, they are not characterized by containing additional non-recirculating B2 cells.

== Structure ==
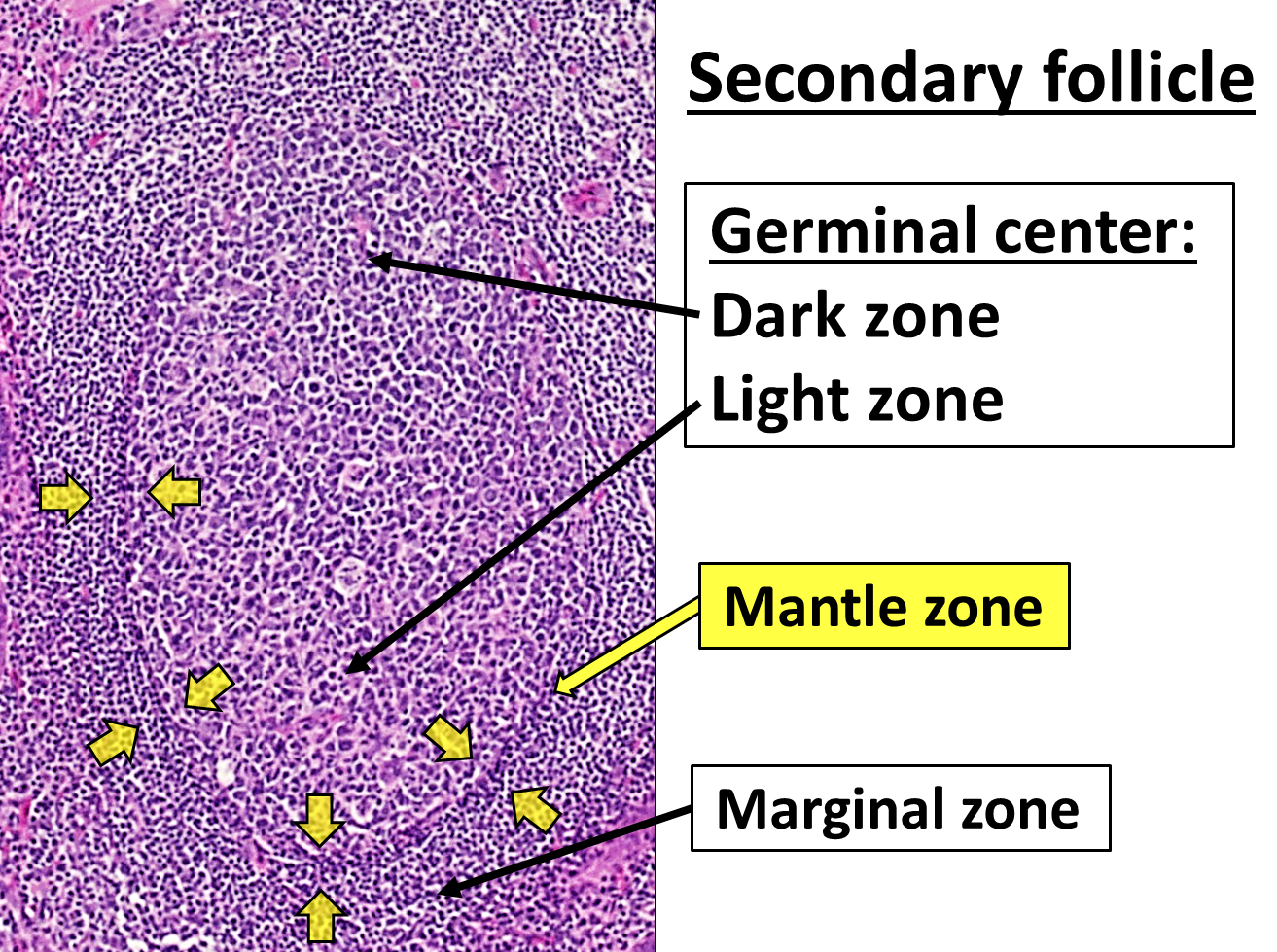
Histology of a normal lymphoid follicle, with marginal zone annotated at bottom.

It is composed of cells derived primarily from the myeloid compartment of bone marrow differentiation. More recently, a population of neutrophil-killers has been described to populate peripheral areas of the marginal zone. At least three distinct cellular markers can be used to identify cells of the marginal zone, MOMA-1, ERTR-9 and MARCO.

=== Blood flow ===
The marginal zone (MZ) is a highly transited area that receives large amounts of blood from the general circulation. Remarkably, the splenic microvasculature shows striking differences in mice and humans. In humans, the spleen receives blood from the splenic artery, which branches into central and penicillar arterioles. Owing to the absence of a histologically defined marginal sinus, the blood flowing in penicillar arterioles directly drains into capillaries of the red pulp and perifollicular zone. The perifollicular zone is a well-defined area of decreased resistance that separates the MZ from the red pulp. Both the perifollicular zone and the red pulp consist of an open circulatory system of blood-filled spaces known as splenic cords, which have no defined endothelial delimitation and are in close contact with the venous sinusoidal vessels of the red pulp.

== Function ==
The major role of marginal zone is to trap particulate antigen from the circulation and present the antigen to the lymphocytes of the spleen.

Experiments have shown that inert latex beads as well as live bacteria such as Escherichia coli and Listeria monocytogenes are trapped by the marginal zone. However, only immunogenic substances, i.e. bacteria, are trafficked to the T and B cell zones of the white-pulp and are efficiently presented to elicit an immune response.

=== Lymphocytes ===
Marginal zone lymphocytes are a type of B cell (Marginal-zone B cell, abbreviated "MZ B cell") created there, capable of binding IgM-antigen complexes. They are notable for their ability to serve several different roles in the immune system. MZ B cells express polyreactive BCRs that bind to multiple microbial molecular patterns.

=== Marginal zone macrophages ===
Within the marginal zone there exists two types of macrophages that are unique to this area: the marginal zone macrophages and the marginal metallophilic macrophages. These two macrophage sub-types are characterized by the expression of SIGN-R1 on the marginal zone macrophages and CD169 (siglec-1, sialoadhesin) on the marginal metallophilic macrophages.

In addition to the marginal zone B-cells that normally reside there, a number of other cell types that are present in the blood pass through the marginal zone e.g. lymphocytes and granulocytes. In addition, a large number of dendritic cells are thought to reside temporarily in the marginal zone before migrating into the white pulp following stimulation and antigen uptake, as well as a large number of lymphocytes remaining in the marginal zone for a period of time during the process of transmigration into the white pulp. It can be assumed that both of these cells will interact with the marginal zone macrophages.

Recent studies have shown that the marginal zone macrophages possess both important innate functions, as well as being able to promote adaptive immune responses, so these macrophages can bridge the innate and adaptive immunity.

The marginal zone macrophages have a variety of functions, one of which is the phagocytosis of blood-borne pathogens. Because of the anatomy of the marginal zone, the blood within it slows down and therefore the pathogens present in the systemic circulation are phagocytosed by both marginal zone macrophages. There is limited data regarding the specific roles of these two macrophage subsets in the uptake and eradication of pathogens. However there is evidence and reports that show there is a specific involvement of the various pathogen receptors on the marginal zone macrophages in recognising and eliminating certain pathogens, especially encapsulated bacteria. For example, the C-type lectin SIGN-R1 receptor (present on the marginal zone macrophages), mediates the recognition of pneumococcal saccharides and is necessary for Streptococcus pneumoniae clearance.

Furthermore, both types of marginal zone macrophages are involved in the clearance and degradation of viruses e.g. cowpox virus and adenovirus serotype 5. Evidence has shown that the clearance of lymphocytic choriomeningitis virus by marginal zone macrophages is crucial to prevent the spreading of viral infections to peripheral organs.

== See also ==
- Marginal zone B-cell lymphoma
- Humoral immunity
