= Red pulp =

Type of tissue in the spleen

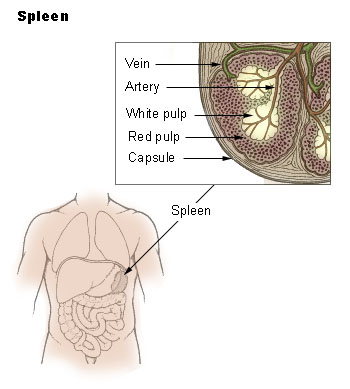
- Spleen

Details

Identifiers
- Latin: pulpa splenica
- TA98: A13.2.01.005
- TA2: 5175
- FMA: 15844

The red pulp of the spleen is composed of connective tissue known also as the cords of Billroth and many splenic sinusoids that are engorged with blood, giving it a red color. Its primary function is to filter the blood of antigens, microorganisms, and defective or worn-out red blood cells.

The spleen is made of red pulp and white pulp, separated by the marginal zone; 76–79% of a normal spleen is red pulp. Unlike white pulp, which mainly contains lymphocytes such as T cells, red pulp is made up of several different types of blood cells, including platelets, granulocytes, red blood cells, and plasma.

The red pulp also acts as a large reservoir for monocytes. These monocytes are found in clusters in the Billroth's cords (red pulp cords). The population of monocytes in this reservoir is greater than the total number of monocytes present in circulation. These stored monocytes, contrary to previous belief, are not progenitors to the self-sustaining red pulp macrophages; their purpose lies in responding to inflammatory signals around the body. They can be rapidly mobilised to leave the spleen and assist in tackling ongoing infections.

== Sinusoids ==
The splenic sinusoids, are wide vessels that drain into pulp veins which themselves drain into trabecular veins. Gaps in the endothelium lining the sinusoids mechanically filter blood cells as they enter the spleen. Worn-out or abnormal red cells attempting to squeeze through the narrow intercellular spaces become badly damaged, and are subsequently devoured by macrophages in the red pulp. In addition to clearing aged red blood cells, the sinusoids also filter out cellular debris, particles that could clutter up the bloodstream.

== Cells found in red pulp ==
Red pulp consists of a dense network of fine reticular fiber, continuous with those of the splenic trabeculae, to which are applied flat, branching cells. The meshes of the reticulum are filled with blood:

- White blood cells are found to be in larger proportion than they are in ordinary blood.
- Large rounded cells, termed splenic cells, are also seen; these are capable of ameboid movement, and often contain pigment and red-blood corpuscles in their interior.
- The cells of the reticulum each possess a round or oval nucleus, and like the splenic cells, they may contain pigment granules in their cytoplasm; they do not stain deeply with carmine, and in this respect differ from the cells of the Malpighian corpuscles.
- In the young spleen, macrophages may also be found, each containing numerous nuclei or one compound nucleus.
- Nucleated red blood cells have also been found in the spleen of young animals.

=== Red pulp macrophages ===
Macrophages are highly diverse mononuclear phagocytes that are present throughout the body, including the spleen. Those located in the red pulp are known as red pulp macrophages (RPMs). They are necessary for maintaining blood homeostasis by performing phagocytosis upon injured and senescent erythrocytes and blood-borne particulates. Evidence suggests that RPMs are mainly produced during embryogenesis and are maintained during adult life.

Additionally, there are a number of cell-intrinsic and cell-extrinsic factors that regulate the development and survival of RPMs, these factors being: Spi-C, IRF8/4, heme oxygenase-1 and M-CSF.

RPM's are capable of inducing the differentiation of regulatory T cells by the expression of transforming growth factor-β. They can also secrete type-1 interferons during parasitic infections.

Blood in the arteries end in the Billroth's cords (red pulp cords). These cords are made up of fibroblasts and reticular fibres which form an open blood system without an endothelial lining, and it is within these cords that F4/80+ macrophages are found, which are associated with the reticular cells of these areas and are collectively known as red pulp macrophages. From the Billroth's cords, the blood passes into the venous sinuses of the red pulp, which are lined with discontinuous endothelium as well as stress fibres extending under the basal plasma membrane, parallel to the cellular axis. This arrangement of the stress fibres combined with the parallel arrangement of the sinus endothelial cells forces the blood in the red pulp through slits that are formed by the stress fibres. However, this passage can become difficult for ageing red blood cells due to their less flexible membranes and therefore they get stuck in the cords and they will be subsequently phagocytosed by the red pulp macrophages. This process is known as erythrophagocytosis, which is important for the turnover of red blood cells and the recycling of iron, which is a major function of the red pulp macrophages and is made possible by this special structure of the red pulp.

The iron from the red blood cells is either released by the red pulp macrophages or stored in the erythrocyte itself in the form of ferritin. Also, the erythrocyte can store larger amounts of iron in the form of hemosiderin (an insoluble complex of partially degraded ferritin), and large deposits of this can be seen in the red pulp macrophages. The red pulp macrophages also obtain iron by scavenging a complex of haemoglobin (released from erythrocytes destroyed intravascularly throughout the body) and haptoglobin, via endocytosis through CD163. The iron stored in the splenic macrophages is released in accordance with the requirements of the bone marrow.

== Diseases ==
In lymphoid leukemia, the white pulp of the spleen hypertrophies and the red pulp shrinks. In some cases the white pulp can swell to 50% of the total volume of the spleen. In myeloid leukemia, the white pulp atrophies and the red pulp expands.
