= Gastric arteries =

Gastric arteries may refer to:

- Left gastric artery
- Left gastro-omental artery
- Right gastric artery
- Right gastro-omental artery
- Short gastric arteries
