= Pancreatic artery =

Pancreatic artery may refer to

- Dorsal pancreatic artery
- Greater pancreatic artery
- Pancreatic branches of splenic artery
