= Gastrosplenic ligament =

Ligament between stomach and spleen

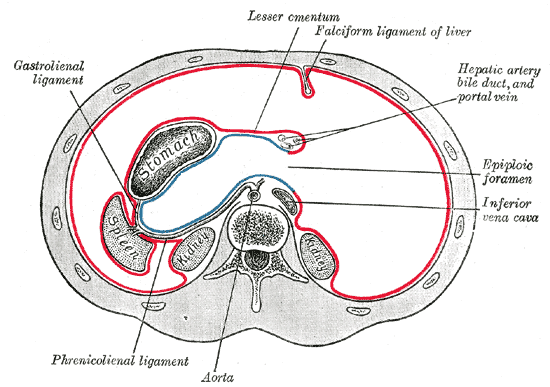
- Horizontal disposition of the peritoneum in the upper part of the abdomen. (Gastrolienal ligament labeled at upper left.)

Details
- Precursor: Dorsal mesogastrium
- From: Greater curvature of the stomach
- To: Splenic hilum

Identifiers
- Latin: ligamentum gastrosplenicum, ligamentum gastrolienale
- TA98: A10.1.02.203
- TA2: 3760
- FMA: 16517

The gastrosplenic ligament (also known as the ligamentum gastrosplenicum or gastrolienal ligament) is a subdivision of the greater omentum extending between the stomach and the spleen. It contains several blood vessels.

== Structure ==
The gastrosplenic ligament consists of visceral peritoneum. It is continuous with the fibrous capsule of the spleen, the greater omentum, and the serosal lining of the stomach. It extends between the greater curvature of stomach and the hilum of the spleen.

=== Contents ===
It contains the short gastric artery and vein, and the left gastroepiploic artery and vein.

=== Development ===
Embryonically, the gastrosplenic ligament is derived from the dorsal mesogastrium.

== Clinical significance ==
=== Gastrosplenic ligament entrapment ===
Small intestine may loop through a perforation in the gastrosplenic ligament, ending lateral to the spleen and stomach. This is known as gastrosplenic ligament entrapment, and is usually caused by abdominal trauma. This is corrected with surgery.

== See also ==
- greater omentum
- Peritoneum
- Lesser omentum
- Right gastroepiploic vein
