= Left gastroepiploic =

Left gastroepiploic may refer to:

- Left gastroepiploic vein
- Left gastroepiploic artery
