= Short gastric =

Short gastric may refer to:

- Short gastric veins
- Short gastric arteries
