= Gastroepiploic vein =

Gastroepiploic vein may refer to:

- Right gastroepiploic vein
- Left gastroepiploic vein
