= Pancreatic branches of splenic artery =

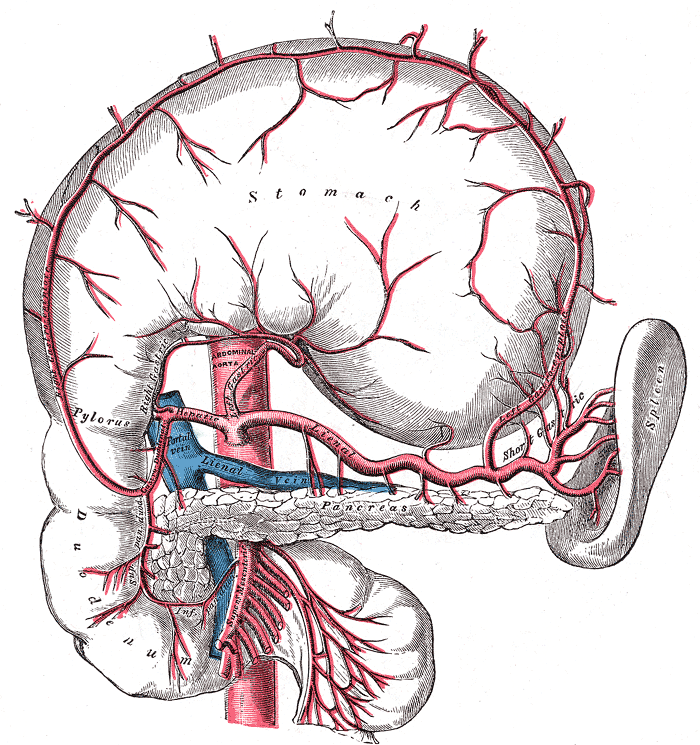
- Branches of the celiac artery

Details
- Source: Splenic artery

Identifiers
- Latin: rami pancreatici arteriae splenicae
- TA98: A12.2.12.041
- TA2: 4240
- FMA: 71551

The pancreatic branches or pancreatic arteries are numerous small vessels derived from the splenic artery as it runs behind the upper border of the pancreas, supplying its body and tail.

One of these, larger than the rest, is sometimes given off near the tail of the pancreas; it runs from left to right near the posterior surface of the gland, following the course of the pancreatic duct, and is called the greater pancreatic artery.

These vessels anastomose with the pancreatic branches of the superior and inferior pancreaticoduodenal artery that are given off by the gastroduodenal artery and superior mesenteric artery respectively.

== Branches ==
There are four main pancreatic branches of the splenic artery:

- Greater pancreatic artery
- Dorsal pancreatic artery
- Inferior pancreatic artery (a.k.a. transverse pancreatic artery)
- Caudal pancreatic artery
