= Esophageal arteries =

Details
- Vein: Esophageal veins
- Supplies: Esophagus

Identifiers
- Latin: arteriae oesophageae
- FMA: 4149

Esophageal (oesophageal in British English) arteries are a group of arteries from disparate sources supplying the esophagus. The blood supply to the esophagus can roughly be divided into thirds, with anastamoses between each area of supply.

More specifically, it can refer to:

- Esophageal branches of inferior thyroid artery (top third) a branch of the thyrocervical trunk of the subclavian artery.
- Esophageal branches of thoracic part of aorta (middle third) sends esophageal arteries towards the thoracic part.
- Esophageal branches of left gastric artery (bottom third) a branch of the celiac trunk and the left inferior phrenic artery.
