= Esophageal =

Esophageal can refer to:

- The esophagus
- Esophageal arteries
- Esophageal glands
- Esophageal cancer
