= Splenic artery =

Artery which supplies blood to the spleen

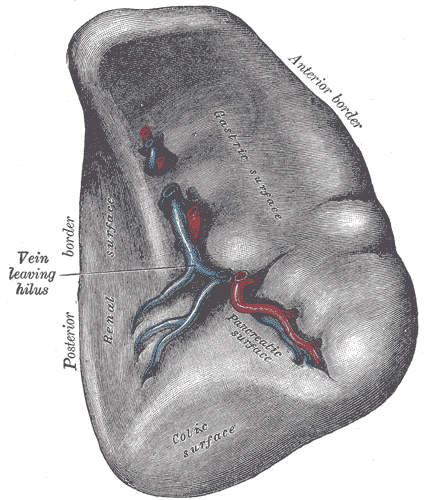
- The visceral surface of the spleen.

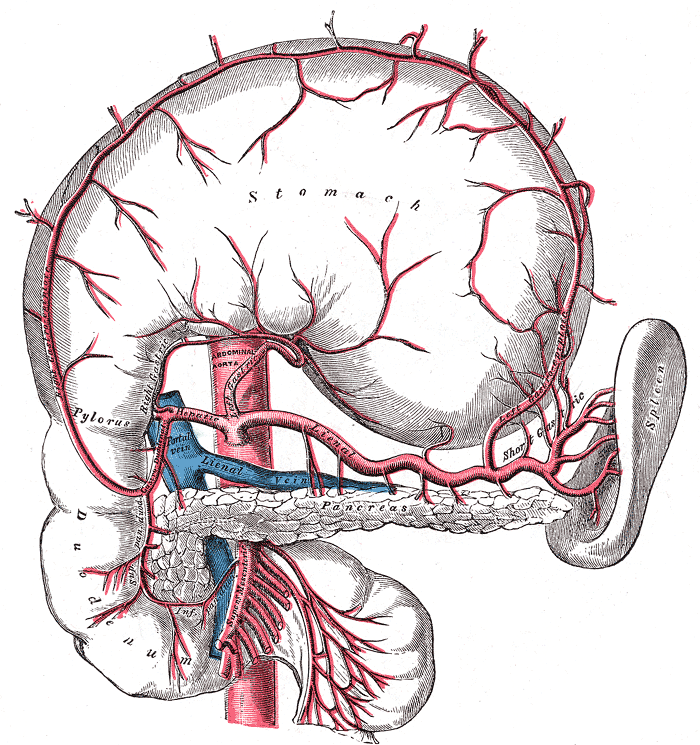
- Branches of the celiac artery. (Lienal artery is an old term for splenic artery, and is visible at center. The spleen is at center right. The stomach has been flipped out to reveal the splenic artery, so the greater curvature is at the top in this diagram.)

Details
- Source: Celiac artery
- Branches: Pancreatic branches pancreatica magna left gastro-omental short gastric trabecular arteries posterior gastric
- Vein: Splenic vein
- Supplies: Spleen

Identifiers
- Latin: arteria splenica, arteria lienalis
- MeSH: D013157
- TA98: A12.2.12.040
- TA2: 4239
- FMA: 14773

In human anatomy, the splenic artery or lienal artery, an older term, is the blood vessel that supplies oxygenated blood to the spleen. It branches from the celiac artery, and follows a course superior to the pancreas. It is known for its tortuous path to the spleen.

== Structure ==
The splenic artery, the largest branch of the celiac trunk, gives off branches to the stomach and pancreas before reaching the spleen.

Branch	Description
branches to the pancreas	multiple branches serving the pancreas including greater pancreatic artery and dorsal pancreatic artery.
short gastric	upper part of greater curvature of the stomach and fundus of the stomach
left gastroepiploic	middle of greater curvature of the stomach
posterior gastric	posterior of stomach, gastric region superior to the splenic artery

Note that the branches of the splenic artery do not reach all the way to the lower part of the greater curvature of the stomach. Instead, that region is supplied by the right gastroepiploic artery, a branch of the gastroduodenal artery. The two gastroepiploic arteries anastomose with each other at that point.

=== Relations ===
The splenic artery passes between the layers of the lienorenal ligament. Along its course, it is accompanied by a similarly named vein, the splenic vein, which drains into the hepatic portal vein.

== Clinical significance ==
Free fluid seen on ultrasound from a ruptured splenic artery aneurysm

Splenic artery aneurysms are rare, but still the third most common abdominal aneurysm, after aneurysms of the abdominal aorta and iliac arteries. They may occur in pregnant women in the third trimester and rupture carries a maternal mortality of greater than 50% and a fetal mortality of 70 to 90%. Risk factors include smoking and hypertension. For the treatment of patients who represent a high surgical risk, percutaneous endovascular treatment may be considered.

== Additional images ==
3D-rendered computed tomography, showing splenic artery at upper right.

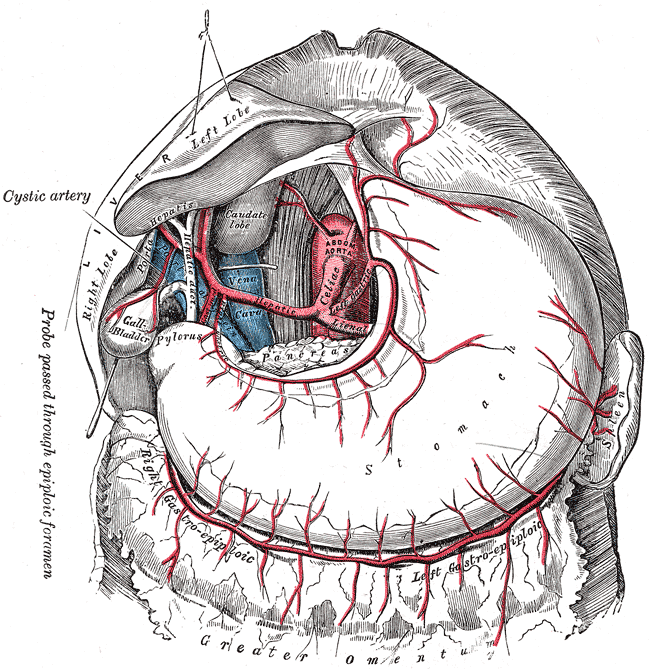
The celiac artery and its branches.

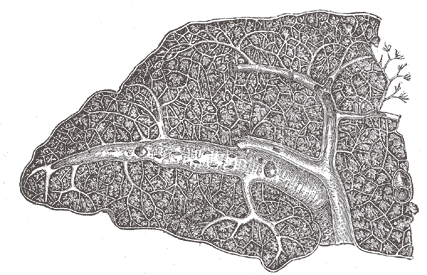
Transverse section of the human spleen, showing the distribution of the splenic artery and its branches.

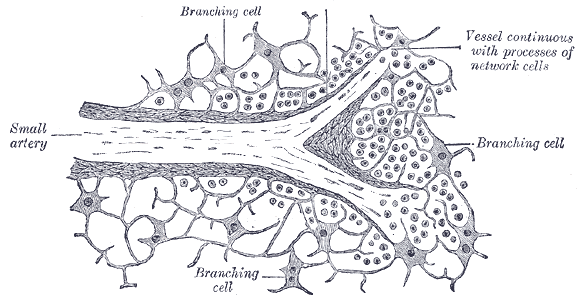
Section of the spleen, showing the termination of the small bloodvessels.

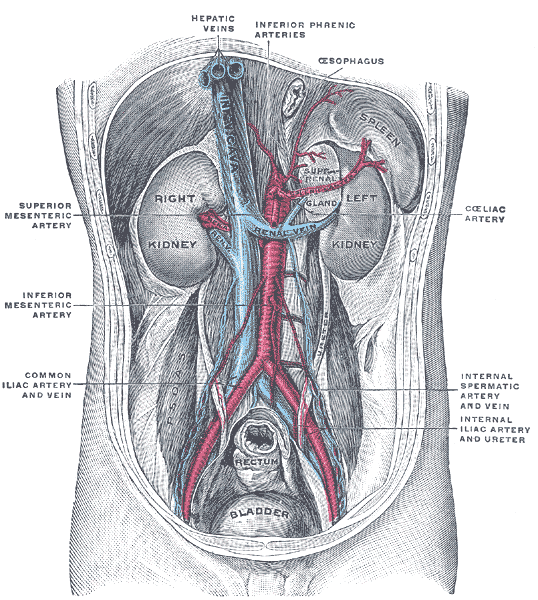
Posterior abdominal wall, after removal of the peritoneum, showing kidneys, suprarenal capsules, and great vessels.

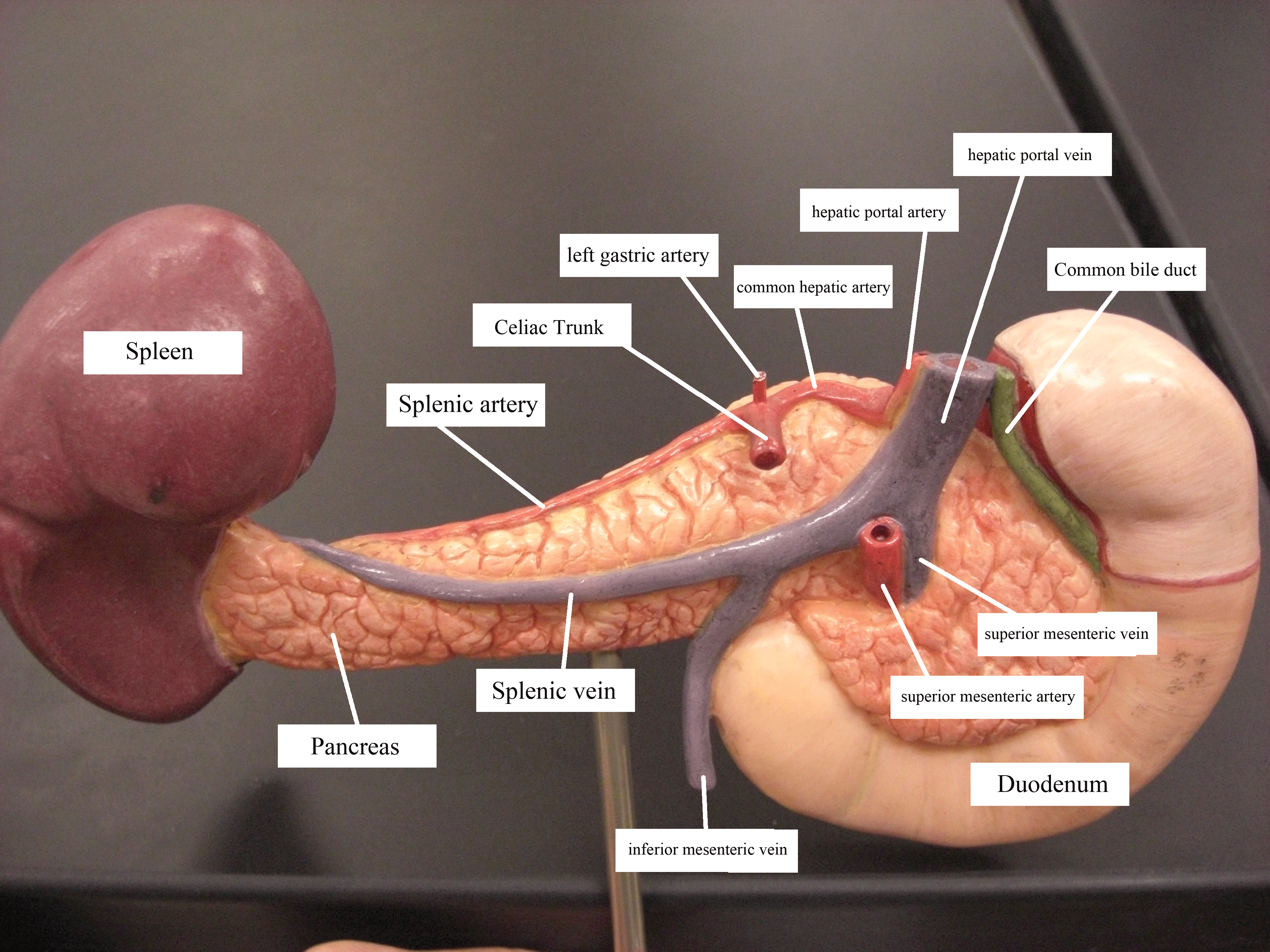
Arteries and veins around the pancreas and spleen.
