= Stomach =

Digestive organ

- Sections of the human stomach

- Scheme of digestive tract, with stomach in red

Details
- Precursor: Foregut
- System: Digestive system
- Artery: Right gastric artery, left gastric artery, right gastro-omental artery, left gastro-omental artery, short gastric arteries
- Vein: Right gastric vein, left gastric vein, right gastroepiploic vein, left gastroepiploic vein, short gastric veins
- Nerve: Celiac ganglia, vagus nerve
- Lymph: Celiac lymph nodes

Identifiers
- Latin: ventriculus, stomachus
- Greek: στόμαχος (stómakhos)
- MeSH: D013270
- TA98: A05.5.01.001
- TA2: 2901
- FMA: 7148

The stomach is a muscular, hollow organ in the upper gastrointestinal tract of humans and many other animals, including several invertebrates. The Ancient Greek name for the stomach is gaster which is used as gastric in medical terms related to the stomach. The stomach has a dilated structure and functions as a vital organ in the digestive system. The stomach is involved in the gastric phase of digestion, following the cephalic phase in which the sight and smell of food and the act of chewing are stimuli. In the stomach a chemical breakdown of food takes place by means of secreted digestive enzymes and gastric acid. It also plays a role in regulating gut microbiota, influencing digestion and overall health.

The stomach is located between the esophagus and the small intestine. The pyloric sphincter controls the passage of partially digested food (chyme) from the stomach into the duodenum, the first and shortest part of the small intestine, where peristalsis takes over to move this through the rest of the intestines.

== Structure ==
In the human digestive system, the stomach lies between the esophagus and the duodenum (the first part of the small intestine). It is in the left upper quadrant of the abdominal cavity. The top of the stomach lies against the diaphragm. Lying behind the stomach is the pancreas. A large double fold of visceral peritoneum called the greater omentum hangs down from the greater curvature of the stomach. Two sphincters keep the contents of the stomach contained; the lower esophageal sphincter (found in the cardiac region), at the junction of the esophagus and stomach, and the pyloric sphincter at the junction of the stomach with the duodenum.

The stomach is surrounded by parasympathetic (inhibitor) and sympathetic (stimulant) plexuses (networks of blood vessels and nerves in the anterior gastric, posterior, superior and inferior, celiac and myenteric), which regulate both the secretory activity of the stomach and the motor (motion) activity of its muscles.

The stomach is distensible, and can normally expand to hold about one litre of food. The shape of the stomach depends upon the degree of its distension and that of surrounding viscera, e.g. the colon. When empty, the stomach is somewhat J-shaped; when partially distended, it becomes pyriform in shape. In obese persons, it is more horizontal. In a newborn human baby the stomach will only be able to hold about 30 millilitres. The maximum stomach volume in adults is between 2 and 4 litres, although volumes of up to 15 litres have been observed in extreme circumstances.

=== Sections ===
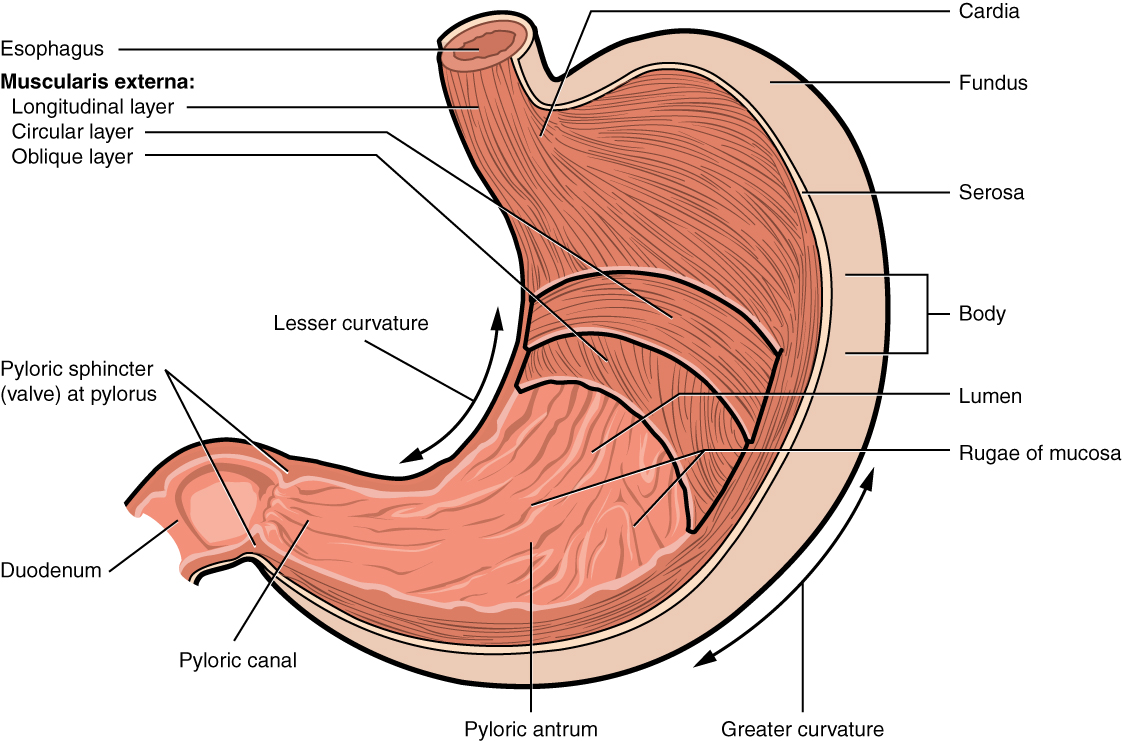
Diagram showing parts of the stomach

The human stomach can be divided into four sections, beginning at the cardia followed by the fundus, the body and the pylorus.

- The gastric cardia is where the contents of the esophagus empty from the gastroesophageal sphincter into the cardiac orifice, the opening into the gastric cardia. A cardiac notch at the left of the cardiac orifice, marks the beginning of the greater curvature of the stomach. A horizontal line across from the cardiac notch gives the dome-shaped region called the fundus. The cardia is a very small region of the stomach that surrounds the esophageal opening.
- The fundus (from Latin 'bottom') is formed in the upper curved part.
- The body or corpus (from Latin) is the main, central region of the stomach.
- The pylorus (from Greek 'gatekeeper') connects the stomach to the duodenum at the pyloric sphincter. The pyloric antrum opens to the body of the stomach.

The cardia is defined as the region following the "z-line" of the gastroesophageal junction, the point at which the epithelium changes from stratified squamous to columnar. Near the cardia is the lower esophageal sphincter.

=== Anatomical proximity ===
The stomach bed refers to the structures upon which the stomach rests in mammals. These include the tail of the pancreas, splenic artery, left kidney, left suprarenal gland, transverse colon and its mesocolon, and the left crus of diaphragm, and the left colic flexure. The term was introduced around 1896 by Philip Polson of the Catholic University School of Medicine, Dublin. However this was brought into disrepute by surgeon anatomist J Massey.

=== Blood supply ===
Schematic image of the blood supply to the human stomach: left and right gastric artery, left and right gastroepiploic artery and short gastric arteries

The lesser curvature of the human stomach is supplied by the right gastric artery inferiorly and the left gastric artery superiorly, which also supplies the cardiac region. The greater curvature is supplied by the right gastroepiploic artery inferiorly and the left gastroepiploic artery superiorly. The fundus of the stomach, and also the upper portion of the greater curvature, is supplied by 5-7 short gastric arteries, which arise from the splenic artery.

=== Lymphatic drainage ===
The two sets of gastric lymph nodes drain the stomach's tissue fluid into the lymphatic system through the intestinal lymph trunk, to the cisterna chyli.

=== Microanatomy ===
==== Wall ====
The gastrointestinal wall of the human stomach

Layers of the gastrointestinal wall of which the stomach is a dilated part

Like the other parts of the gastrointestinal wall, the human stomach wall from inner to outer, consists of a mucosa, submucosa, muscular layer, subserosa and serosa.

The inner part of the stomach wall is the gastric mucosa a mucous membrane that forms the lining of the stomach. The membrane consists of an outer layer of columnar epithelium, a lamina propria, and a thin layer of smooth muscle called the muscularis mucosa. Beneath the mucosa lies the submucosa, consisting of fibrous connective tissue. Meissner's plexus is in this layer interior to the oblique muscle layer.

Outside of the submucosa lies the muscular layer. It consists of three layers of muscular fibres, with fibres lying at angles to each other. These are the inner oblique, middle circular, and outer longitudinal layers. The presence of the inner oblique layer is distinct from other parts of the gastrointestinal tract, which do not possess this layer. The stomach contains the thickest muscular layer consisting of three layers, thus maximum peristalsis occurs here.

- The inner oblique layer: This layer is responsible for creating the motion that churns and physically breaks down the food. It is the only layer of the three which is not seen in other parts of the digestive system. The antrum has thicker skin cells in its walls and performs more forceful contractions than the fundus.
- The middle circular layer: At this layer, the pylorus is surrounded by a thick circular muscular wall, which is normally tonically constricted, forming a functional (if not anatomically discrete) pyloric sphincter, which controls the movement of chyme into the duodenum. This layer is concentric to the longitudinal axis of the stomach.
- The myenteric plexus (Auerbach's plexus) is found between the outer longitudinal and the middle circular layer and is responsible for the innervation of both (causing peristalsis and mixing).

The outer longitudinal layer is responsible for moving the semi-digested food towards the pylorus of the stomach through muscular shortening.

To the outside of the muscular layer lies a serosa, consisting of layers of connective tissue continuous with the peritoneum.

Smooth mucosa along the inside of the lesser curvature forms a passageway - the gastric canal that fast-tracks liquids entering the stomach, to the pylorus.

==== Glands ====
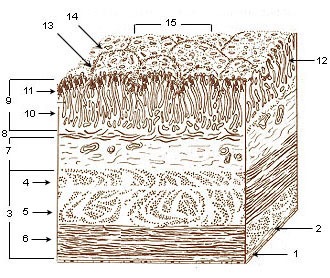
Diagram showing gastric pits (13) gastric glands (12) lamina propria (10) epithelium (11)

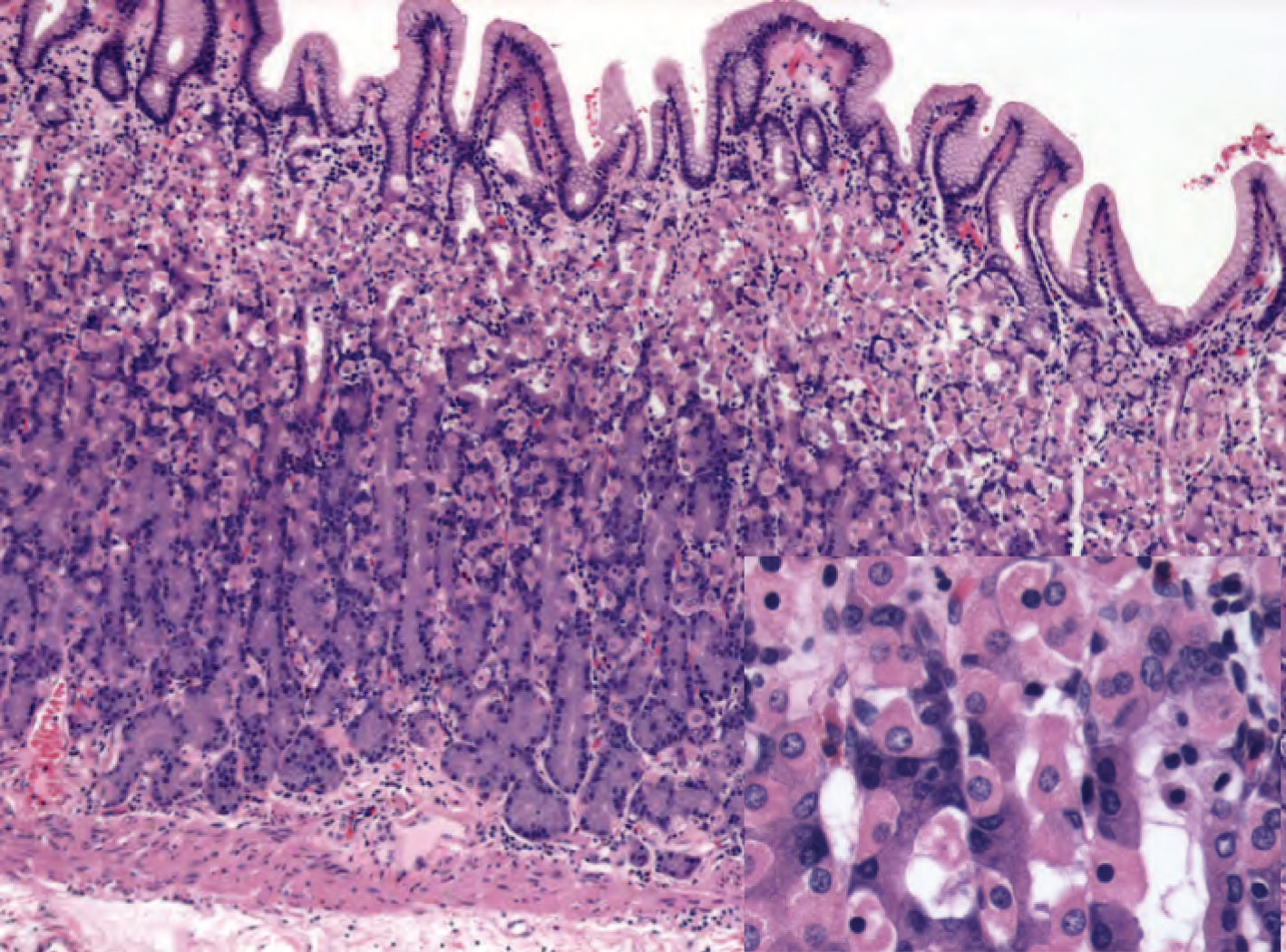
Histology of normal fundic mucosa. Fundic glands are simple, branched tubular glands that extend from the bottom of the gastric pits to the muscularis mucosae; the more distinctive cells are parietal cells. H&E stain.

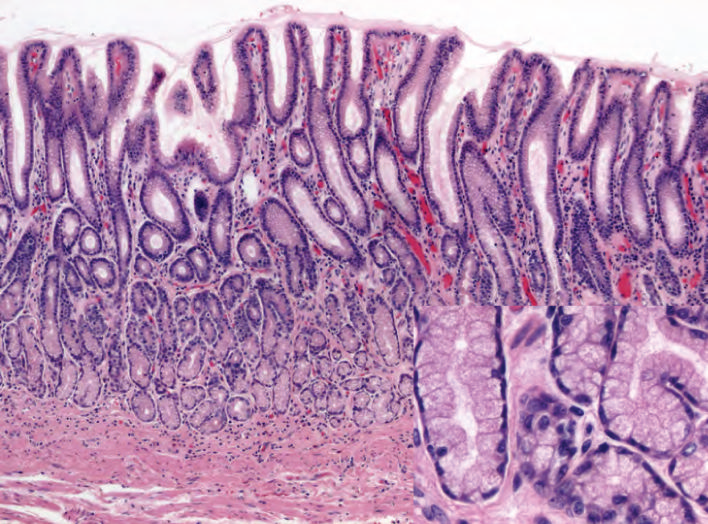
Histology of normal antral mucosa. Antral mucosa is formed by branched coiled tubular glands lined by secretory cells similar in appearance to the surface mucous cells. H&E stain.

The mucosa lining the stomach is lined with gastric pits, which receive gastric juice, secreted by between 2 and 7 gastric glands. Gastric juice is an acidic fluid containing hydrochloric acid and digestive enzymes. The glands contains a number of cells, with the function of the glands changing depending on their position within the stomach.

Within the body and fundus of the stomach lie the fundic glands. In general, these glands are lined by column-shaped cells that secrete a protective layer of mucus and bicarbonate. Additional cells present include parietal cells that secrete hydrochloric acid and intrinsic factor, chief cells that secrete pepsinogen (this is a precursor to pepsin- the highly acidic environment converts the pepsinogen to pepsin), and neuroendocrine cells that secrete serotonin.

Glands differ where the stomach meets the esophagus and near the pylorus. Near the gastroesophageal junction lie cardiac glands, which primarily secrete mucus. They are fewer in number than the other gastric glands and are more shallowly positioned in the mucosa. There are two kinds - either simple tubular glands with short ducts or compound racemose resembling the duodenal Brunner's glands. Near the pylorus lie pyloric glands located in the antrum of the pylorus. They secrete mucus, as well as gastrin produced by their G cells.

=== Gene and protein expression ===
About 20,000 protein-coding genes are expressed in human cells and nearly 70% of these genes are expressed in the normal stomach. Just over 150 of these genes are more specifically expressed in the stomach compared to other organs, with only some 20 genes being highly specific. The corresponding specific proteins expressed in stomach are mainly involved in creating a suitable environment for handling the digestion of food for uptake of nutrients. Highly stomach-specific proteins include gastrokine-1 expressed in the mucosa; pepsinogen and gastric lipase, expressed in gastric chief cells; and a gastric ATPase and gastric intrinsic factor, expressed in parietal cells.

== Development ==
In the early part of the development of the human embryo, the ventral part of the embryo abuts the yolk sac. During the third week of development, as the embryo grows, it begins to surround parts of the yolk sac. The enveloped portions form the basis for the adult gastrointestinal tract. The sac is surrounded by a network of vitelline arteries and veins. Over time, these arteries consolidate into the three main arteries that supply the developing gastrointestinal tract: the celiac artery, superior mesenteric artery, and inferior mesenteric artery. The areas supplied by these arteries are used to define the foregut, midgut, and hindgut. The surrounded sac becomes the primitive gut. Sections of this gut begin to differentiate into the organs of the gastrointestinal tract, and the esophagus, and stomach form from the foregut.

As the stomach rotates during early development, the dorsal and ventral mesentery rotate with it; this rotation produces a space anterior to the expanding stomach called the greater sac, and a space posterior to the stomach called the lesser sac. After this rotation the dorsal mesentery thins and forms the greater omentum, which is attached to the greater curvature of the stomach. The ventral mesentery forms the lesser omentum, and is attached to the developing liver. In the adult, these connective structures of omentum and mesentery form the peritoneum, and act as an insulating and protective layer while also supplying organs with blood and lymph vessels as well as nerves. Arterial supply to all these structures is from the celiac trunk, and venous drainage is by the portal venous system. Lymph from these organs is drained to the prevertebral celiac nodes at the origin of the celiac artery from the aorta.

== Function ==
=== Digestion ===
In the human digestive system, a bolus (a small rounded mass of chewed up food) enters the stomach through the esophagus via the lower esophageal sphincter. The stomach releases proteases (protein-digesting enzymes such as pepsin), and hydrochloric acid, which kills or inhibits bacteria and provides the acidic pH of 2 for the proteases to work. Food is churned by the stomach through peristaltic muscular contractions of the wall – reducing the volume of the bolus, before looping around the fundus and the body of stomach as the boluses are converted into chyme (partially digested food). Chyme slowly passes through the pyloric sphincter and into the duodenum of the small intestine, where the extraction of nutrients begins.

Gastric juice in the stomach contains pepsinogen and gastric acid, (hydrochloric acid) which activates this inactive form of enzyme into the active form, pepsin. Pepsin breaks down proteins into polypeptides.

==== Mechanical digestion ====
Within a few moments after food enters the stomach, mixing waves begin to occur at intervals of approximately 20 seconds. A mixing wave is a unique type of peristalsis that mixes and softens the food with gastric juices to create chyme. The initial mixing waves are relatively gentle, but these are followed by more intense waves, starting at the body of the stomach and increasing in force as they reach the pylorus.

The pylorus, which holds around 30 mL of chyme, acts as a filter, permitting only liquids and small food particles to pass through the mostly, but not fully, closed pyloric sphincter. In a process called gastric emptying, rhythmic mixing waves force about 3 mL of chyme at a time through the pyloric sphincter and into the duodenum. Release of a greater amount of chyme at one time would overwhelm the capacity of the small intestine to handle it. The rest of the chyme is pushed back into the body of the stomach, where it continues mixing. This process is repeated when the next mixing waves force more chyme into the duodenum.

Gastric emptying is regulated by both the stomach and the duodenum. The presence of chyme in the duodenum activates receptors that inhibit gastric secretion. This prevents additional chyme from being released by the stomach before the duodenum is ready to process it.

==== Chemical digestion ====
The fundus stores both undigested food and gases that are released during the process of chemical digestion. Food may sit in the fundus of the stomach for a while before being mixed with the chyme. While the food is in the fundus, the digestive activities of salivary amylase continue until the food begins mixing with the acidic chyme. Ultimately, mixing waves incorporate this food with the chyme, the acidity of which inactivates salivary amylase and activates lingual lipase. Lingual lipase then begins breaking down triglycerides into free fatty acids, and mono- and diglycerides.

The breakdown of protein begins in the stomach through the actions of hydrochloric acid, and the enzyme pepsin.

The stomach can also produce gastric lipase, which can help digesting fat.

The contents of the stomach are completely emptied into the duodenum within two to four hours after the meal is eaten. Different types of food take different amounts of time to process. Foods heavy in carbohydrates empty fastest, followed by high-protein foods. Meals with a high triglyceride content remain in the stomach the longest. Since enzymes in the small intestine digest fats slowly, food can stay in the stomach for 6 hours or longer when the duodenum is processing fatty chyme. However, this is still a fraction of the 24 to 72 hours that full digestion typically takes from start to finish.

=== Absorption ===
Although the absorption in the human digestive system is mainly a function of the small intestine, some absorption of certain small molecules nevertheless does occur in the stomach through its lining. This includes:

- Water, if the body is dehydrated
- Medication, such as aspirin
- Amino acids
- 10–20% of ingested ethanol (e.g. from alcoholic beverages)
- Caffeine
- To a small extent water-soluble vitamins (most are absorbed in the small intestine)

The parietal cells of the human stomach are responsible for producing intrinsic factor, which is necessary for the absorption of vitamin B12. B12 is used in cellular metabolism and is necessary for the production of red blood cells, and the functioning of the nervous system.

=== Control of secretion and motility ===
Emptying of stomach chyme into the duodenum through the pyloric sphincter

Chyme from the stomach is slowly released into the duodenum through coordinated peristalsis and opening of the pyloric sphincter. The movement and the flow of chemicals into the stomach are controlled by both the autonomic nervous system and by the various digestive hormones of the digestive system:

Gastrin	The hormone gastrin causes an increase in the secretion of HCl from the parietal cells and pepsinogen from chief cells in the stomach. It also causes increased motility in the stomach. Gastrin is released by G cells in the stomach in response to distension of the antrum and digestive products (especially large quantities of incompletely digested proteins). It is inhibited by a pH normally less than 4(high acid), as well as the hormone somatostatin.
Cholecystokinin	Cholecystokinin (CCK) has most effect on the gall bladder, causing gall bladder contractions, but it also decreases gastric emptying and increases release of pancreatic juice, which is alkaline and neutralizes the chyme. CCK is synthesized by I-cells in the mucosal epithelium of the small intestine.
Secretin	In a different and rare manner, secretin, which has the most effects on the pancreas, also diminishes acid secretion in the stomach. Secretin is synthesized by S-cells, which are located in the duodenal mucosa as well as in the jejunal mucosa in smaller numbers.
Gastric inhibitory polypeptide	Gastric inhibitory polypeptide (GIP) decreases both gastric acid release and motility. GIP is synthesized by K-cells, which are located in the duodenal and jejunal mucosa.
Enteroglucagon	Enteroglucagon decreases both gastric acid and motility.

Other than gastrin, these hormones all act to turn off the stomach action. This is in response to food products in the liver and gall bladder, which have not yet been absorbed. The stomach needs to push food into the small intestine only when the intestine is not busy. While the intestine is full and still digesting food, the stomach acts as storage for food.

=== Other ===
Effects of EGF

Epidermal growth factor (EGF) results in cellular proliferation, differentiation, and survival. EGF is a low-molecular-weight polypeptide first purified from the mouse submandibular gland, but since then found in many human tissues including the submandibular gland, and the parotid gland. Salivary EGF, which also seems to be regulated by dietary inorganic iodine, also plays an important physiological role in the maintenance of oro-esophageal and gastric tissue integrity. The biological effects of salivary EGF include healing of oral and gastroesophageal ulcers, inhibition of gastric acid secretion, stimulation of DNA synthesis, and mucosal protection from intraluminal injurious factors such as gastric acid, bile acids, pepsin, and trypsin and from physical, chemical, and bacterial agents.

Stomach as nutrition sensor

The human stomach has receptors responsive to sodium glutamate and this information is passed to the lateral hypothalamus and limbic system in the brain as a palatability signal through the vagus nerve. The stomach can also sense, independently of tongue and oral taste receptors, glucose, carbohydrates, proteins, and fats. This allows the brain to link nutritional value of foods to their tastes.

Thyrogastric syndrome

This syndrome defines the association between thyroid disease and chronic gastritis, which was first described in the 1960s. This term was coined also to indicate the presence of thyroid autoantibodies or autoimmune thyroid disease in patients with pernicious anemia, a late clinical stage of atrophic gastritis. In 1993, a more complete investigation on the stomach and thyroid was published, reporting that the thyroid is, embryogenetically and phylogenetically, derived from a primitive stomach, and that the thyroid cells, such as primitive gastroenteric cells, migrated and specialized in uptake of iodide and in storage and elaboration of iodine compounds during vertebrate evolution. In fact, the stomach and thyroid share iodine-concentrating ability and many morphological and functional similarities, such as cell polarity and apical microvilli, similar organ-specific antigens and associated autoimmune diseases, secretion of glycoproteins (thyroglobulin and mucin) and peptide hormones, the digesting and readsorbing ability, and lastly, similar ability to form iodotyrosines by peroxidase activity, where iodide acts as an electron donor in the presence of H_{2}O_{2}. In the following years, many researchers published reviews about this syndrome.

== Clinical significance ==
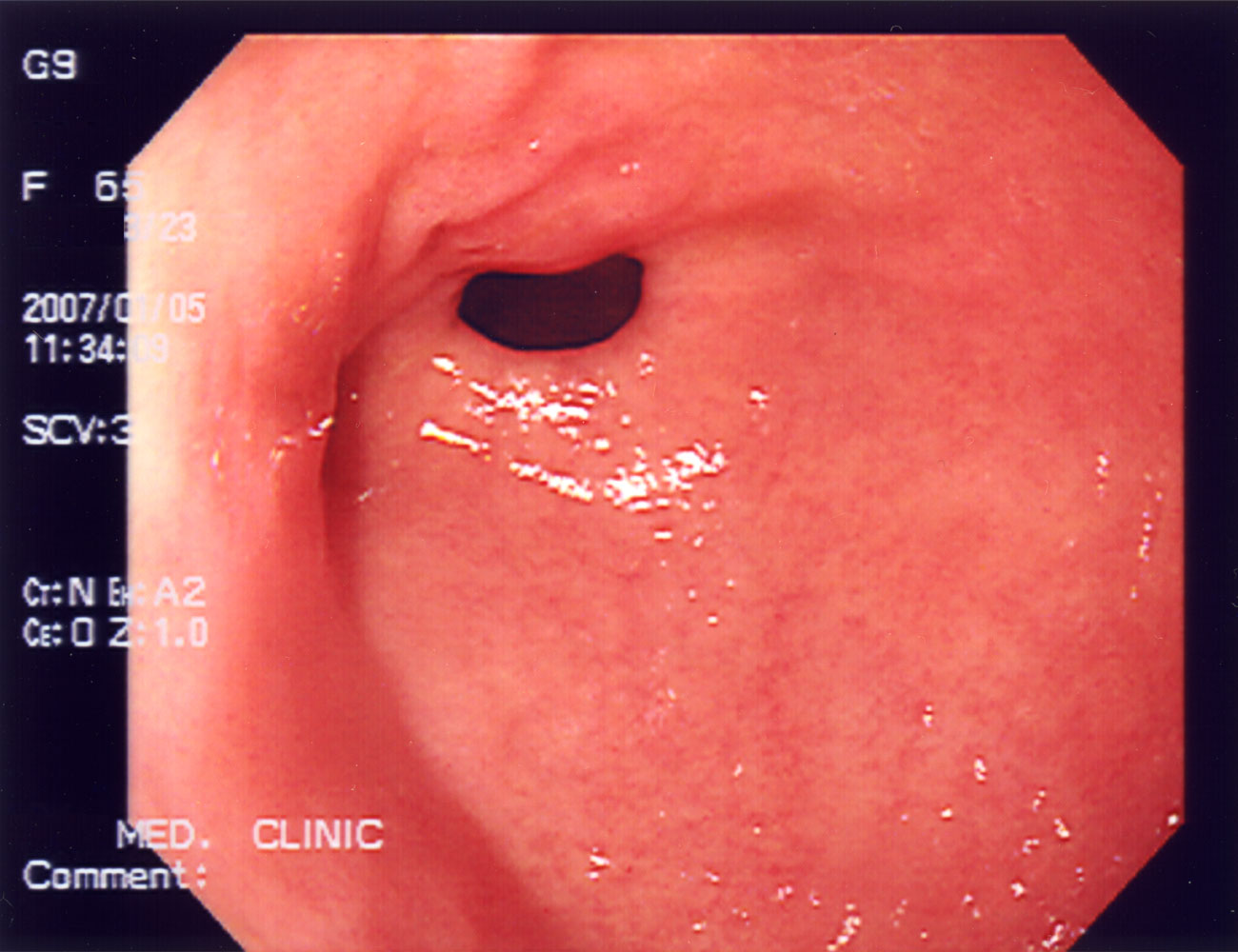
An endoscopy of a normal stomach of a healthy 65-year-old woman

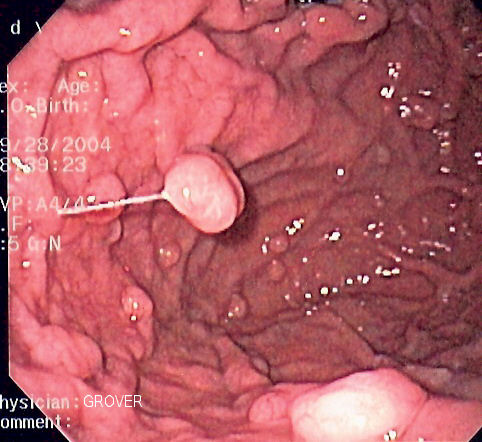
Endoscopic image of a fundic gland polyp

=== Diseases ===
A series of radiographs can be used to examine the stomach for various disorders. This will often include the use of a barium swallow. Another method of examination of the stomach is the use of an endoscope. A gastric emptying study is considered the gold standard to assess the gastric emptying rate.

A large number of studies have indicated that most cases of peptic ulcers, and gastritis, in humans are caused by Helicobacter pylori infection, and an association has been seen with the development of stomach cancer.

A stomach rumble is actually noise from the intestines.

=== Surgery ===
In humans, many bariatric surgery procedures involve the stomach, in order to lose weight. A gastric band may be placed around the cardia area, which can adjust to limit intake. The anatomy of the stomach may be modified, or the stomach may be bypassed entirely.

Surgical removal of the stomach is called a gastrectomy, and removal of the cardia area is a called a cardiectomy. "Cardiectomy" is a term that is also used to describe the removal of the heart. A gastrectomy may be carried out because of gastric cancer or severe perforation of the stomach wall.

Fundoplication is stomach surgery in which the fundus is wrapped around the lower esophagus and stitched into place. It is used to treat gastroesophageal reflux disease (GERD).

=== Etymology ===
The word stomach is derived from Greek stomachos (στόμαχος), ultimately from stoma (στόμα) 'mouth'. Gastro- and gastric (meaning 'related to the stomach') are both derived from Greek gaster (γαστήρ) 'belly'.

== Other animals ==
Although the precise shape and size of the stomach varies widely among different vertebrates, the relative positions of the esophageal and duodenal openings remain relatively constant. As a result, the organ always curves somewhat to the left before curving back to meet the pyloric sphincter. However, lampreys, hagfishes, chimaeras, lungfishes, and some teleost fish have no stomach at all, with the esophagus opening directly into the intestine. These animals all consume diets that require little storage of food, no predigestion with gastric juices, or both.

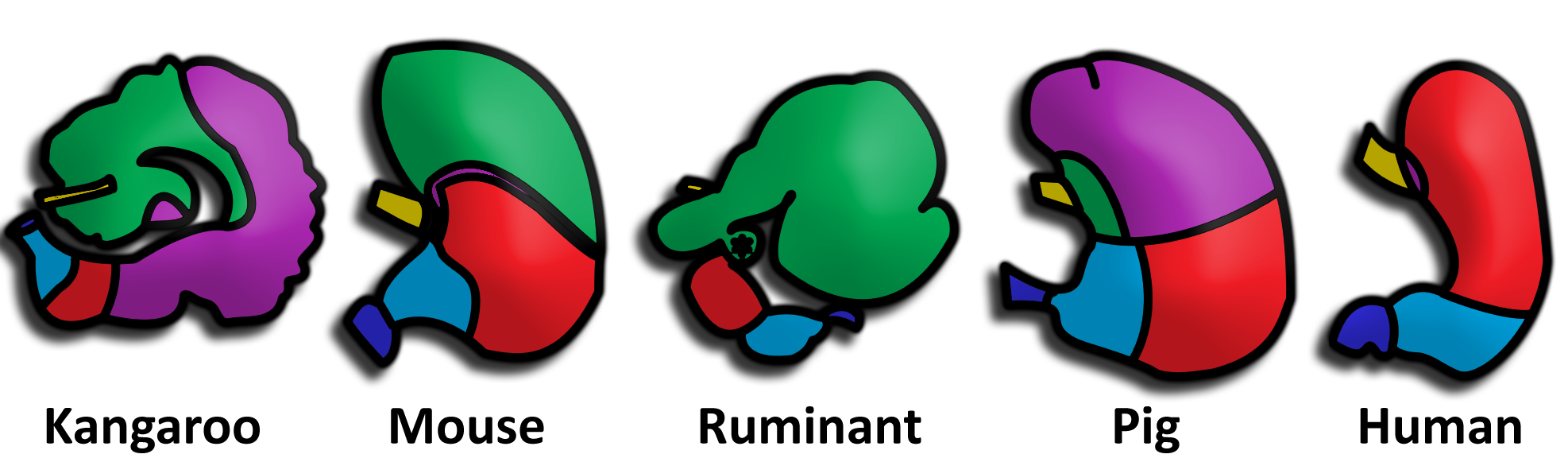
Comparison of stomach glandular regions from several mammalian species. Frequency of glands may vary more smoothly between regions than is diagrammed here. Asterisk (ruminant) represents the omasum, which is absent in Tylopoda. (Tylopoda also have some cardiac glands opening onto ventral reticulum and rumen.) Many other variations exist among the mammals.

Yellow
Esophagus
Green
Esophageal (nonglandular) region.
Purple
Cardiac gland region.
Red
Fundic gland region.
Blue
Pyloric gland region.
Dark blue
Duodenum

The gastric lining is usually divided into two regions, an anterior portion lined by fundic glands and a posterior portion lined with pyloric glands. Cardiac glands are unique to mammals, and even then are absent in a number of species. The distributions of these glands vary between species, and do not always correspond with the same regions as in humans. Furthermore, in many non-human mammals, a portion of the stomach anterior to the cardiac glands is lined with epithelium essentially identical to that of the esophagus. Ruminants, in particular, have a complex four-chambered stomach. The first three chambers (rumen, reticulum, and omasum) are all lined with esophageal mucosa, while the final chamber functions like a monogastric stomach, which is called the abomasum.

In birds and crocodilians, the stomach is divided into two regions. Anteriorly is a narrow tubular region, the proventriculus, lined by fundic glands, and connecting the true stomach to the crop. Beyond lies the powerful muscular gizzard, lined by pyloric glands, and, in some species, containing stones that the animal swallows to help grind up food.

In insects, there is also a crop. The insect stomach is called the midgut.

Information about the stomach in echinoderms or molluscs can be found under the respective articles.

== Additional images ==
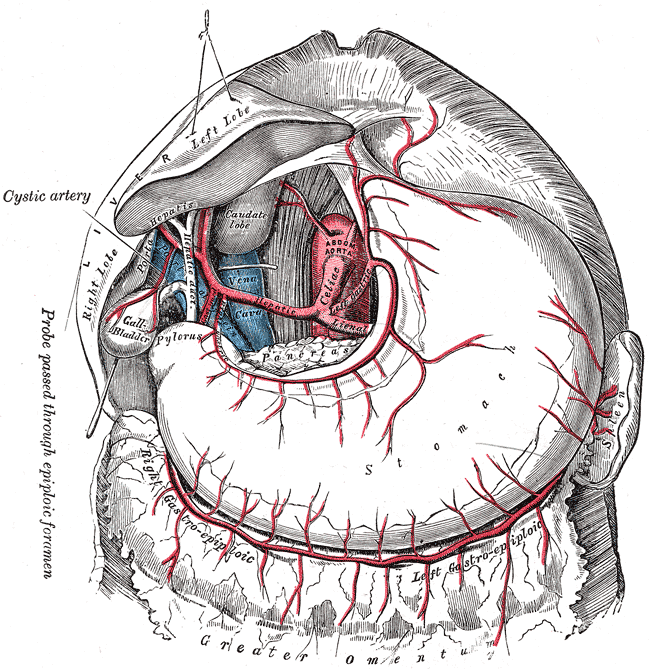
Image showing the celiac artery and its branches

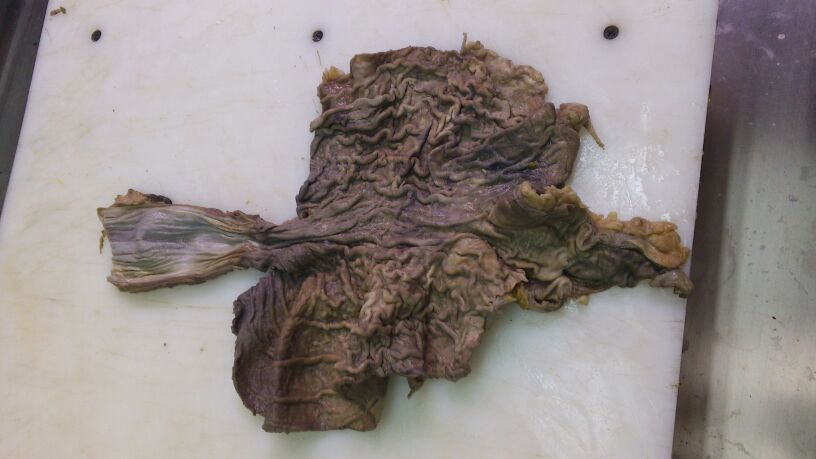
A human stomach at autopsy showing the many folds (rugae)

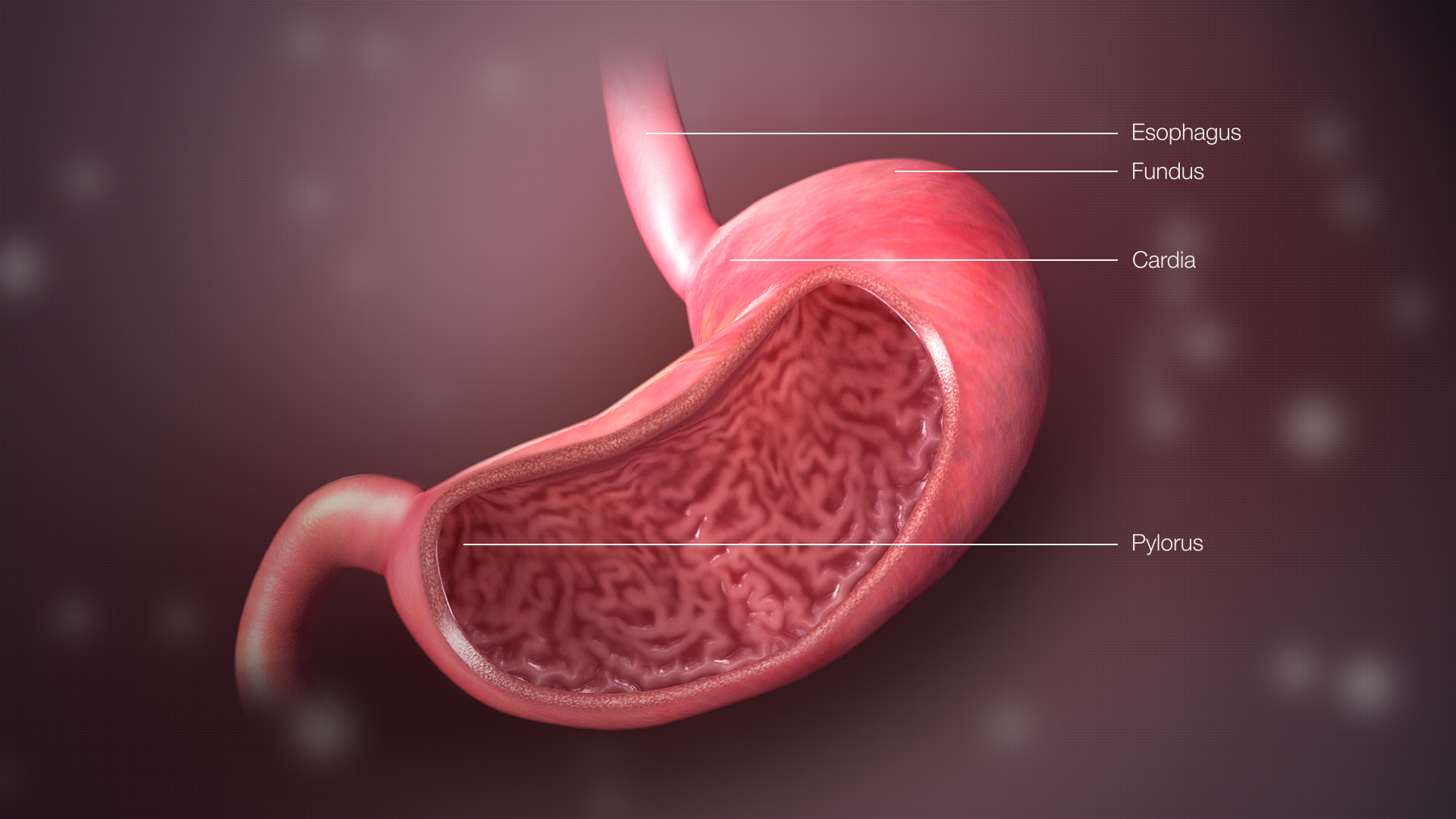
High-quality image of the stomach

== See also ==
- Gastroesophageal reflux disease
- Gastric microbiota
- Proton-pump inhibitor
