= Right gastroepiploic artery =

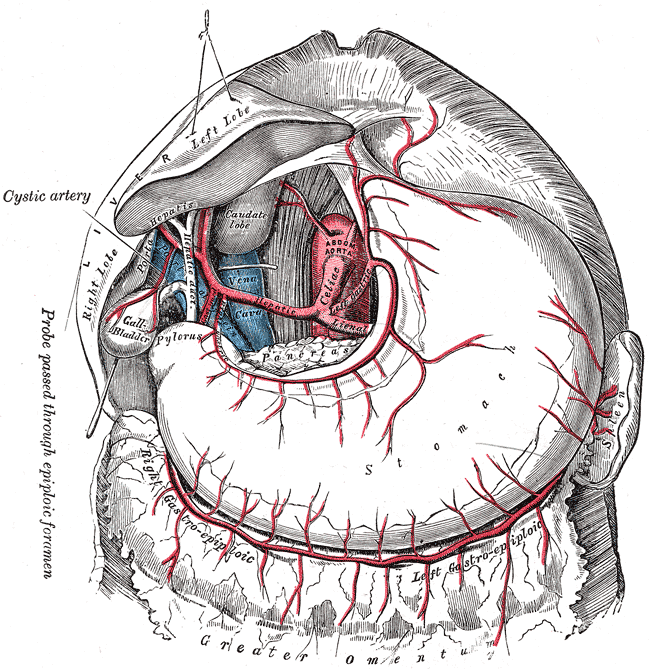
- The celiac artery and its branches; the liver has been raised, and the lesser omentum and anterior layer of the greater omentum removed. (Right gastroepiploic artery visible at lower left.)

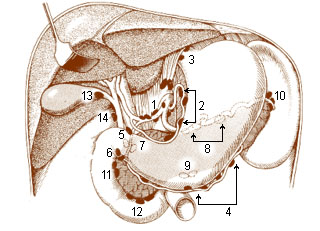
- Right and left gastroomental is at #4.

Details
- Source: Gastroduodenal artery
- Vein: Right gastroepiploic vein

Identifiers
- Latin: arteria gastro-omentalis dextra, arteria gastroepiploica dextra
- TA98: A12.2.12.022
- TA2: 4221
- FMA: 14781

The right gastroepiploic artery (or right gastro-omental artery) is one of the two terminal branches of the gastroduodenal artery. It runs from right to left along the greater curvature of the stomach, between the layers of the greater omentum, anastomosing with the left gastroepiploic artery, a branch of the splenic artery.

Blood supply to the stomach: left and right gastric artery, left and right gastroepiploic artery and short gastric artery.

Except at the pylorus where it is in contact with the stomach, it lies about a finger's breadth from the greater curvature.

== Branches ==
This vessel gives off numerous branches:

- "gastric branches": ascend to supply both surfaces of the stomach.
- "omental branches": descend to supply the greater omentum and anastomose with branches of the middle colic.

== Use in coronary artery surgery ==
The right gastroepiploic artery was first used as a coronary artery bypass graft (CABG) in 1984 by John Pym and colleagues at Queen's University. It has become an accepted alternative conduit, and is particularly useful in patients who do not have suitable saphenous veins to harvest for grafts. The right gastroepiploic artery is typically used as a graft to coronary arteries on the posterior wall of the heart such as the right coronary artery and the posterior descending branch.
