= Esophageal branches of thoracic part of aorta =

Details
- Source: Descending aorta
- Vein: Esophageal veins
- Supplies: Esophagus

Identifiers
- Latin: rami oesophageales partis thoracicae aortae
- TA98: A12.2.11.003
- TA2: 4188
- FMA: 71537

The esophageal arteries four or five in number, arise from the front of the aorta, and pass obliquely downward to the esophagus, forming a chain of anastomoses along that tube, anastomosing with the esophageal branches of the inferior thyroid arteries above, and with ascending branches from the left inferior phrenic and left gastric arteries below. These arteries supply the middle third of the esophagus.
