= Greater pancreatic artery =

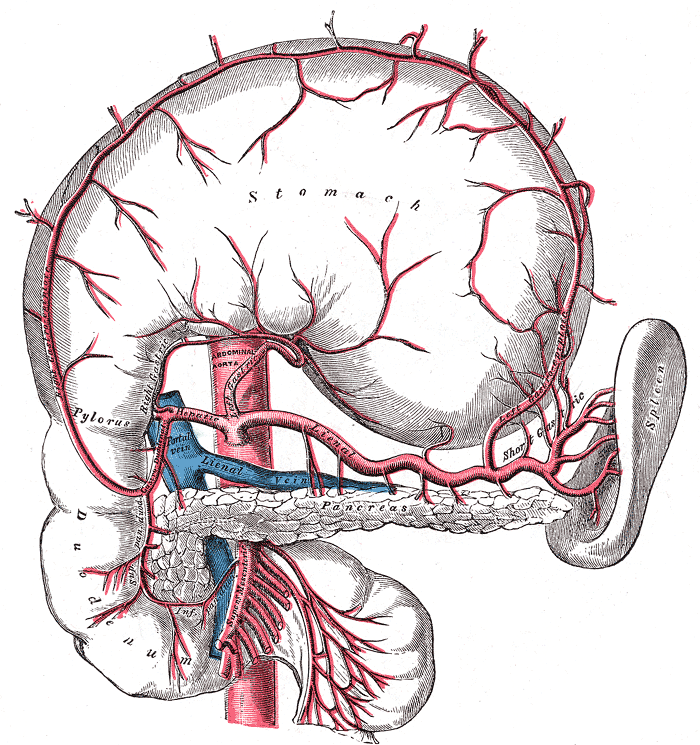
- Branches of the celiac artery

Details
- Source: Splenic artery

Identifiers
- Latin: arteria pancreatica magna
- TA98: A12.2.12.045
- TA2: 4244
- FMA: 14792

In human anatomy, the greater pancreatic artery (great pancreatic artery or arteria pancreatica magna), is the largest artery that supplies the pancreas. It arises from the splenic artery.

== Clinical relevance ==
Rarely, the greater pancreatic artery can rupture as a complication of chronic pancreatitis; this is often fatal.

== See also ==
- Upper gastrointestinal bleed
- Pancreatic branches of splenic artery
