= Esophageal branches of left gastric artery =

Details
- Source: Left gastric artery
- Supplies: Esophagus

Identifiers
- Latin: rami oesophageales arteriae gastricae sinistrae
- TA98: A12.2.12.014
- TA2: 4213
- FMA: 70431

The esophageal branches of left gastric artery are branches which supply the esophagus.
