= Esophageal veins =

Veins of the thorax and abdomen

Details
- Artery: Esophageal artery

Identifiers
- Latin: venae oesophageales
- TA98: A12.3.04.011; A12.3.07.006
- TA2: 4751
- FMA: 70834

The esophageal veins drain blood from the esophagus to the azygos vein, in the thorax, and to the inferior thyroid vein in the neck. It also drains, although with less significance, to the hemiazygos vein, posterior intercostal vein and bronchial veins.

In the abdomen, some drain to the left gastric vein which drains into the portal vein.

== See also ==
- Esophageal varices
