= Gastrokine-1 =

Protein-coding gene in the species Homo sapiens

GKN1

Identifiers
- Aliases: GKN1, AMP18, BRICD1, CA11, FOV, foveolin, gastrokine 1
- External IDs: OMIM: 606402; MGI: 1913533; GeneCards: GKN1

Gene location (Human)
Chr.	Chromosome 2 (human)
Band	2p13.3	Start	68,974,573 bp
Band	2p13.3	End	68,980,980 bp

Gene location (Mouse)
Chr.	Chromosome 6 (mouse)
Band	6|6 D1	Start	87,322,632 bp
Band	6|6 D1	End	87,327,924 bp
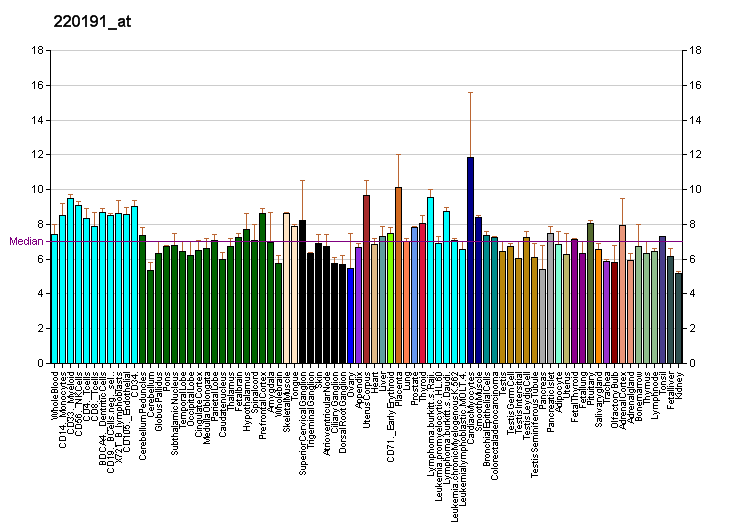
RNA expression pattern
Bgee	Human / Mouse (ortholog); Top expressed in: gastric mucosa; pylorus; cardia; mucosa of ileum; body of stomach; fundus; decidua; left adrenal gland; right adrenal cortex; left adrenal cortex / Top expressed in: epithelium of stomach; mucous cell of stomach; pyloric antrum; duodenum; interventricular septum; esophagus; decidua; cornea; jejunum; islet of Langerhans; More reference expression data
BioGPS	More reference expression data
Gene ontology
Molecular function	molecular function
Cellular component	extracellular region; extracellular space; cellular component
Biological process	digestion; positive regulation of cell division; regulation of cell population proliferation
Sources:Amigo / QuickGO
Orthologs
Databases	NCBI: entry; OMA: entry
Species	Human	Mouse
Entrez	56287	66283
Ensembl	ENSG00000169605	ENSMUSG00000030050
UniProt	Q9NS71	Q9CR36
RefSeq (mRNA)	NM_019617	NM_025466
RefSeq (protein)	NP_062563	NP_079742
Location (UCSC)	Chr 2: 68.97 – 68.98 Mb	Chr 6: 87.32 – 87.33 Mb
PubMed search
- Wikidata
View/Edit Human	View/Edit Mouse

Gastrokine-1 is a protein that in humans is encoded by the GKN1 gene.

The protein encoded by this gene is found to be down-regulated in human gastric cancer tissue as compared to normal gastric mucosa.
