= Short gastric veins =

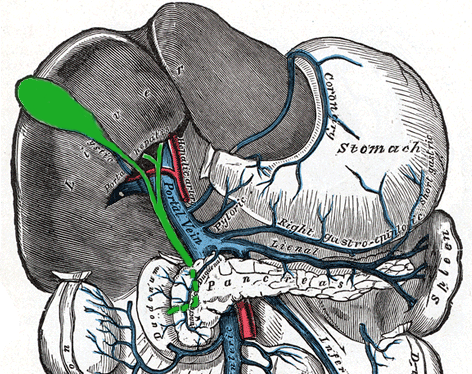
- The portal vein and its tributaries (short gastric veins visible at upper right)

Details
- Drains from: Stomach
- Drains to: Splenic vein

Identifiers
- Latin: venae gastricae breves
- TA98: A12.3.12.030
- TA2: 5125
- FMA: 70931

The short gastric veins, four or five in number, drain the fundus and left part of the greater curvature of the stomach, and pass between the two layers of the gastrolienal ligament to end in the splenic vein or in one of its large tributaries.
