= Left gastric artery =

Artery

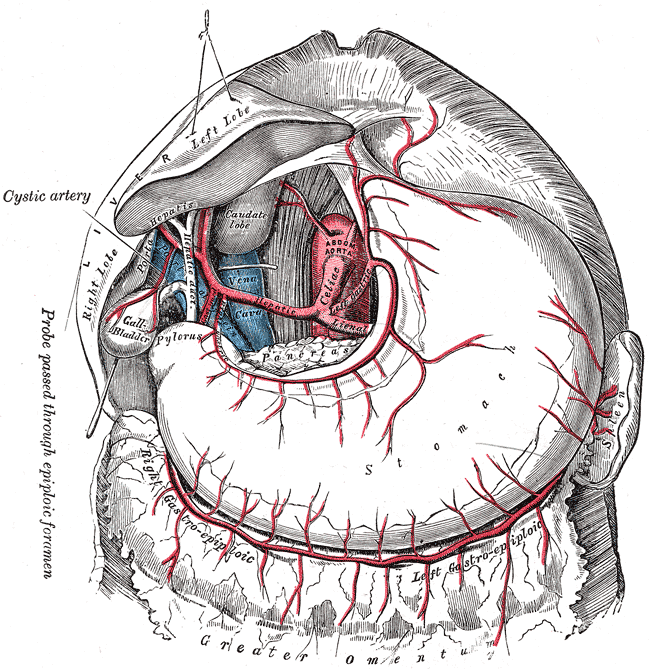
- The left gastric artery and other branches of the celiac artery (stomach in situ). Left gastric artery identified near lesser curvature.

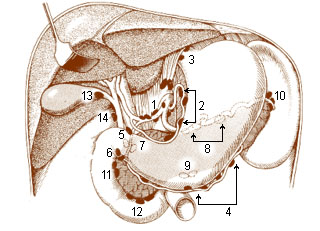
- Left gastric artery is at #2 -- the upper of the two arrows.

Details
- Source: Celiac artery

Identifiers
- Latin: arteria gastrica sinistra
- TA98: A12.2.12.013
- TA2: 4212
- FMA: 14768

In human anatomy, the left gastric artery arises from the celiac artery and runs along the superior portion of the lesser curvature of the stomach before anastomosing with the right gastric artery (which runs right to left). It also issues esophageal branches that supply lower esophagus and ascend through the esophageal hiatus to form anastomoses with the esophageal branches of thoracic part of aorta.

== Anatomy ==
=== Origin ===
The LGA usually arises from (the superior aspect of) the coeliac trunk - sometimes as a terminal branch of a trifurcation, and more rarely as a side branch of the splenic artery or of common hepatic artery. Sometimes it originates directly from aorta or from arteria phrenica inferior.

=== Course ===
From the crus of diaphragm, the LGA arches obliquely anterior-ward and to the left to reach the left curvature of the stomach just inferior to the gastric cardia (thus erecting the gastropancreatic (peritoneal) fold).

=== Fate ===
Upon reaching the cardia, the LGA splits into two terminal branches - a ventral one and a dorsal one - which anastomose with corresponding terminal branches of the right gastric artery, together providing arterial supply to the lesser curvature of the stomach.

=== Branches ===
Besides its terminal ventral branch and dorsal branch, the LGA yields multiple side branches: the left lateral hepatic artery, posterior esophageal artery, anterior esophagocardiotuberous artery, branches to lymph nodes, and omental branches.

== Clinical significance ==
In terms of disease, the left gastric artery may be involved in peptic ulcer disease: if an ulcer erodes through the stomach mucosa into a branch of the artery, this can cause massive blood loss into the stomach, which may result in such symptoms as hematemesis or melaena.

== Additional images ==
Blood supply to the stomach: left and right gastric artery, left and right gastro-omental artery and short gastric artery.

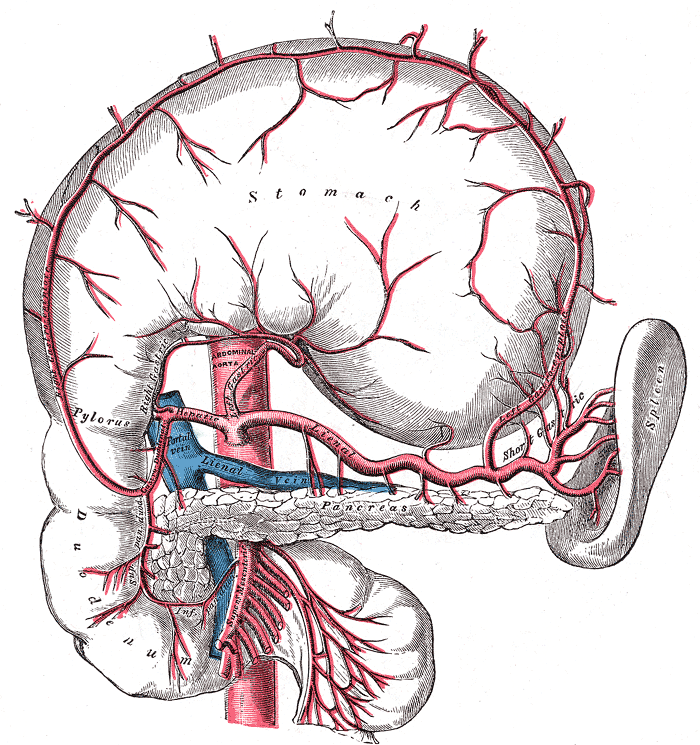
The celiac artery and its branches; the stomach has been raised and the peritoneum removed.

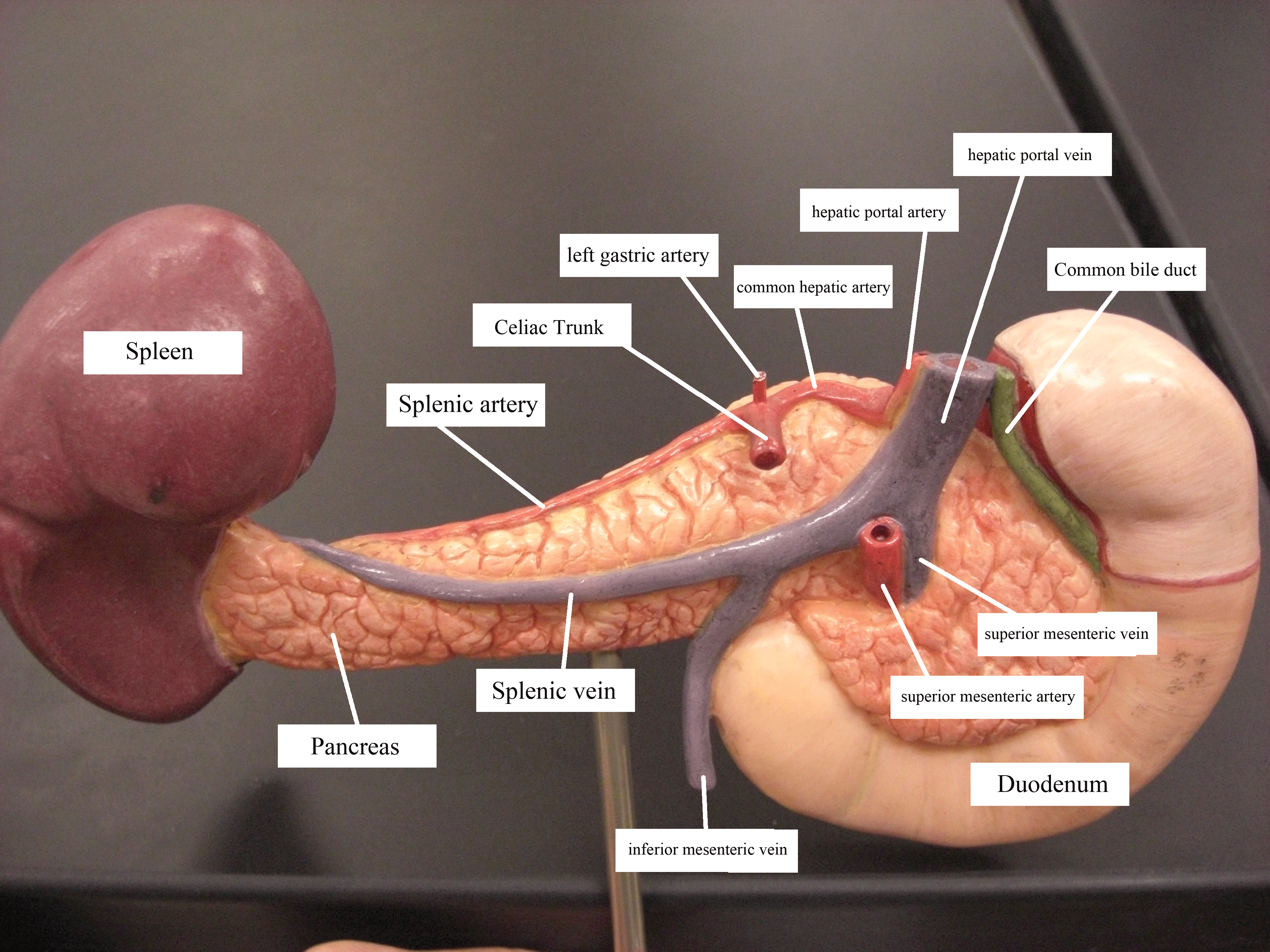
Arteries and veins around the pancreas and spleen.
