= Right gastric artery =

Blood vessel of the human digestive system

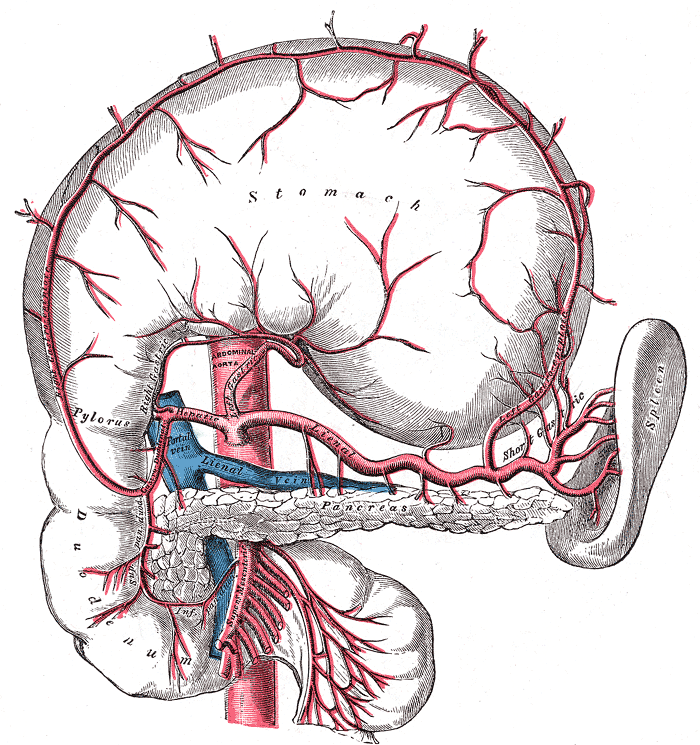
- The celiac artery and its branches; the stomach has been raised and the peritoneum removed. (Right gastric artery visible at center left.)

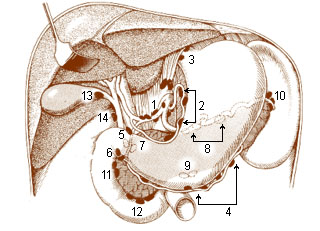
- Right gastric artery is at #2 -- the lower of the two arrows.

Details
- Source: Proper hepatic artery
- Vein: Right gastric vein
- Supplies: Stomach

Identifiers
- Latin: arteria gastrica dextra
- TA98: A12.2.12.028
- TA2: 4228
- FMA: 14776

The right gastric artery usually arises from the proper hepatic artery. It descends to the pyloric end of the stomach before passing from right to left along its lesser curvature, supplying it with branches, and finally anastomosing with the left gastric artery.

== Anatomy ==
=== Variation ===
Origin

In most (53%) individuals, the RGA arises from the proper hepatic artery. It can also arise from the region of division of the common hepatic artery (20%), the left branch of the hepatic artery (15%), the gastroduodenal artery (8%), and - most rarely - the common hepatic artery itself (4%).

== Additional images ==
Blood supply to the stomach: left and right gastric artery, left and right gastro-omental artery and short gastric artery.

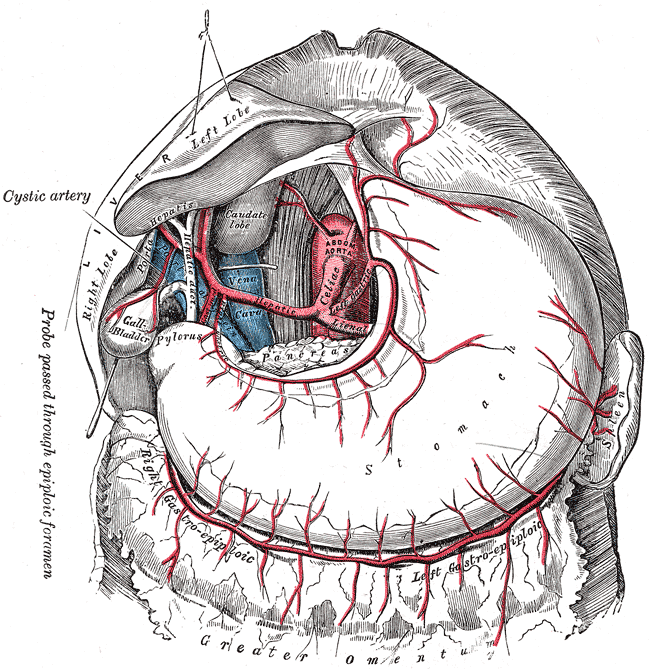
The celiac artery and its branches; the liver has been raised, and the lesser omentum and anterior layer of the greater omentum removed.

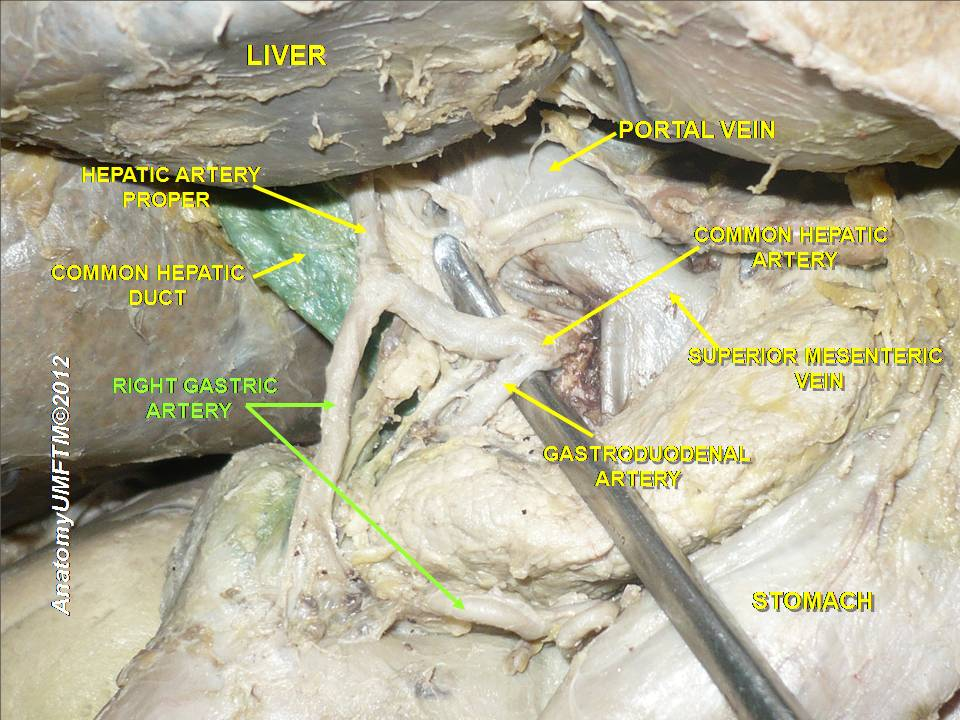
Right gastric artery
