= Right gastroepiploic vein =

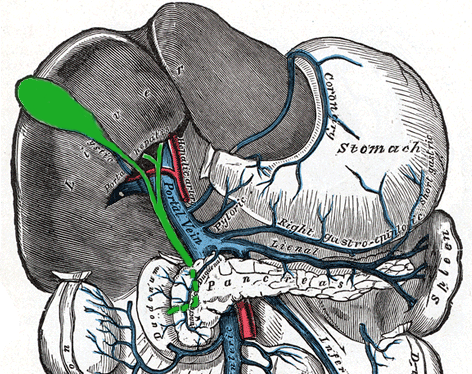

Details
- Drains from: Stomach
- Drains to: Superior mesenteric vein
- Artery: Right gastroepiploic artery

Identifiers
- Latin: vena gastroomentalis dextra, vena gastroepiploica dextra
- TA98: A12.3.12.021
- TA2: 5116
- FMA: 15397

The right gastroepiploic vein (right gastroomental vein) is a blood vessel that drains blood from the greater curvature and left part of the body of the stomach into the superior mesenteric vein. It runs from left to right along the greater curvature of the stomach between the two layers of the greater omentum, along with the right gastroepiploic artery.

As a tributary of the superior mesenteric vein, it is a part of the hepatic portal system.
