= Short gastric arteries =

Small group of arteries from the splenic artery that supply the fundus of the stomach

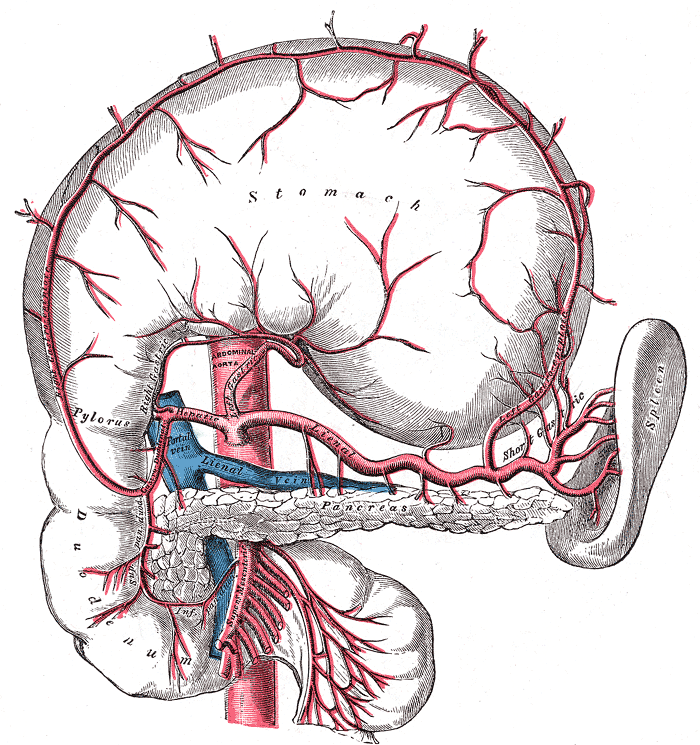
- The celiac artery and its branches; the stomach has been raised and the peritoneum removed. (Short gastric visible at center right.)

Details
- Source: Splenic artery
- Supplies: Greater curvature of the stomach

Identifiers
- Latin: arteriae gastricae breves
- TA98: A12.2.12.050
- TA2: 4251
- FMA: 70808

The short gastric arteries are 5-7 small branches of the splenic artery that pass along part of the greater curvature of the stomach from left to right between the layers of the gastrosplenic ligament, and are distributed to the greater curvature of the stomach.

== Structure ==
Blood supply to the stomach: left and right gastric artery, left and right gastro-omental artery and short gastric artery.

=== Origin ===
The short gastric arteries arise from the end of the splenic artery and its terminal divisions.

=== Distribution ===
The short gastric arteries supply the fundus of the stomach on the side of the greater curvature of the stomach.

=== Anastomoses ===
The short gastric arteries form anastomoses with branches of the left gastric artery, and left gastroepiploic artery.

Unlike the gastroepiploics and the left and right gastric arteries, the short gastric arteries have poor anastomoses if the splenic artery is blocked.
