= Left gastroepiploic vein =

Vein in the torso

Details
- Drains to: Splenic vein
- Artery: Left gastro-omental artery

Identifiers
- Latin: vena gastroomentalis sinistra, vena gastroepiploica sinistra
- TA98: A12.3.12.031
- TA2: 5126
- FMA: 15390

The left gastroepiploic vein (left gastro-omental vein) receives branches from the antero-superior and postero-inferior surfaces of the stomach and from the greater omentum; it runs from right to left along the greater curvature of the stomach and ends in the commencement of the splenic vein.

The splenic vein and superior mesenteric vein join to form the hepatic portal vein.
