= Dorsal pancreatic artery =

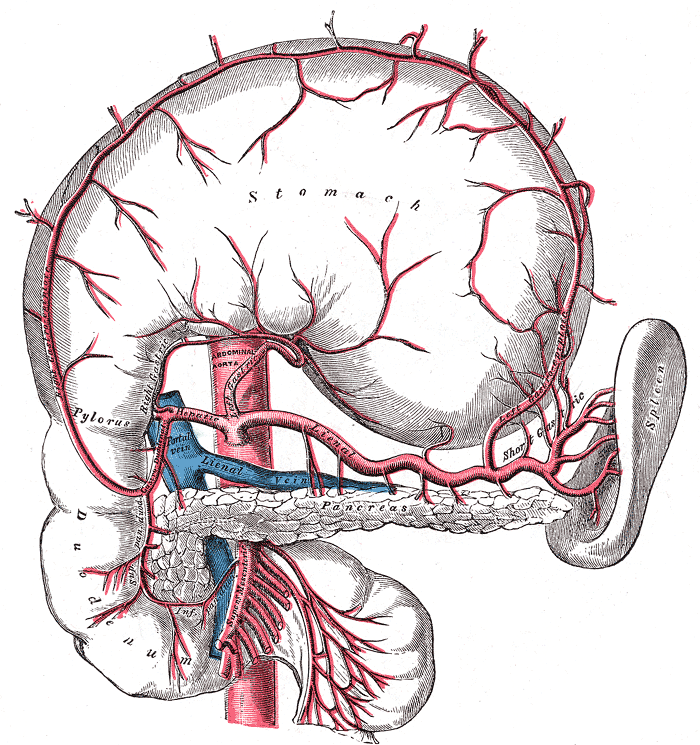
- Branches of the celiac artery.

Details
- Source: Splenic artery
- Supplies: Pancreas

Identifiers
- Latin: arteria pancreatica dorsalis
- TA98: A12.2.12.042
- TA2: 4241
- FMA: 14787

The dorsal pancreatic artery is a branch of the splenic artery. It anastomoses with the superior pancreaticoduodenal artery and continues as the inferior pancreatic artery on its lower border.

== Anatomy ==
The dorsal pancreatic artery is a short artery that issues numerous branches. Its course and length depends upon its (variable) origin.

=== Origin ===
The dorsal pancreatic artery usually arises from the proximal 2 cm (0.79 in) of the splenic artery. It may also arise from the common hepatic artery, superior mesenteric artery, or coeliac trunck.

=== Fate ===
It consistently terminates near the inferior border of the pancreas, near to the origin of the portal vein.
