= Celiac artery =

First major branch of the abdominal aorta

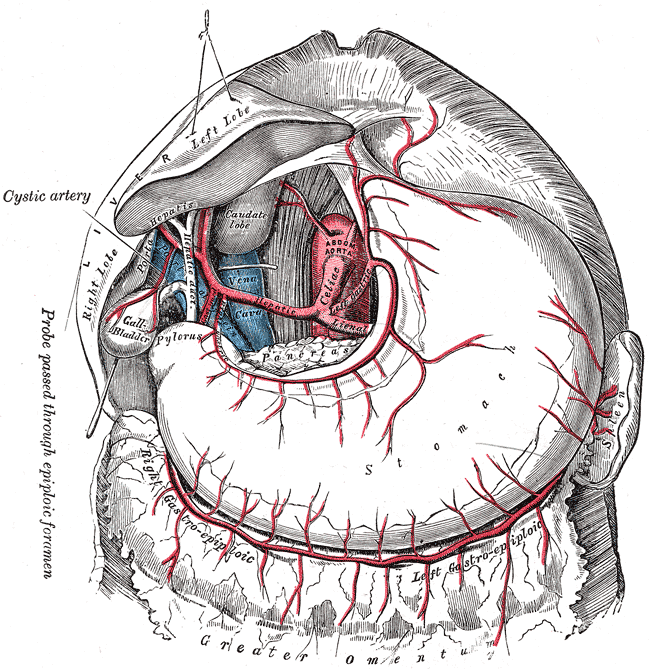
- The celiac artery and its branches. (Celiac artery visible at center.)

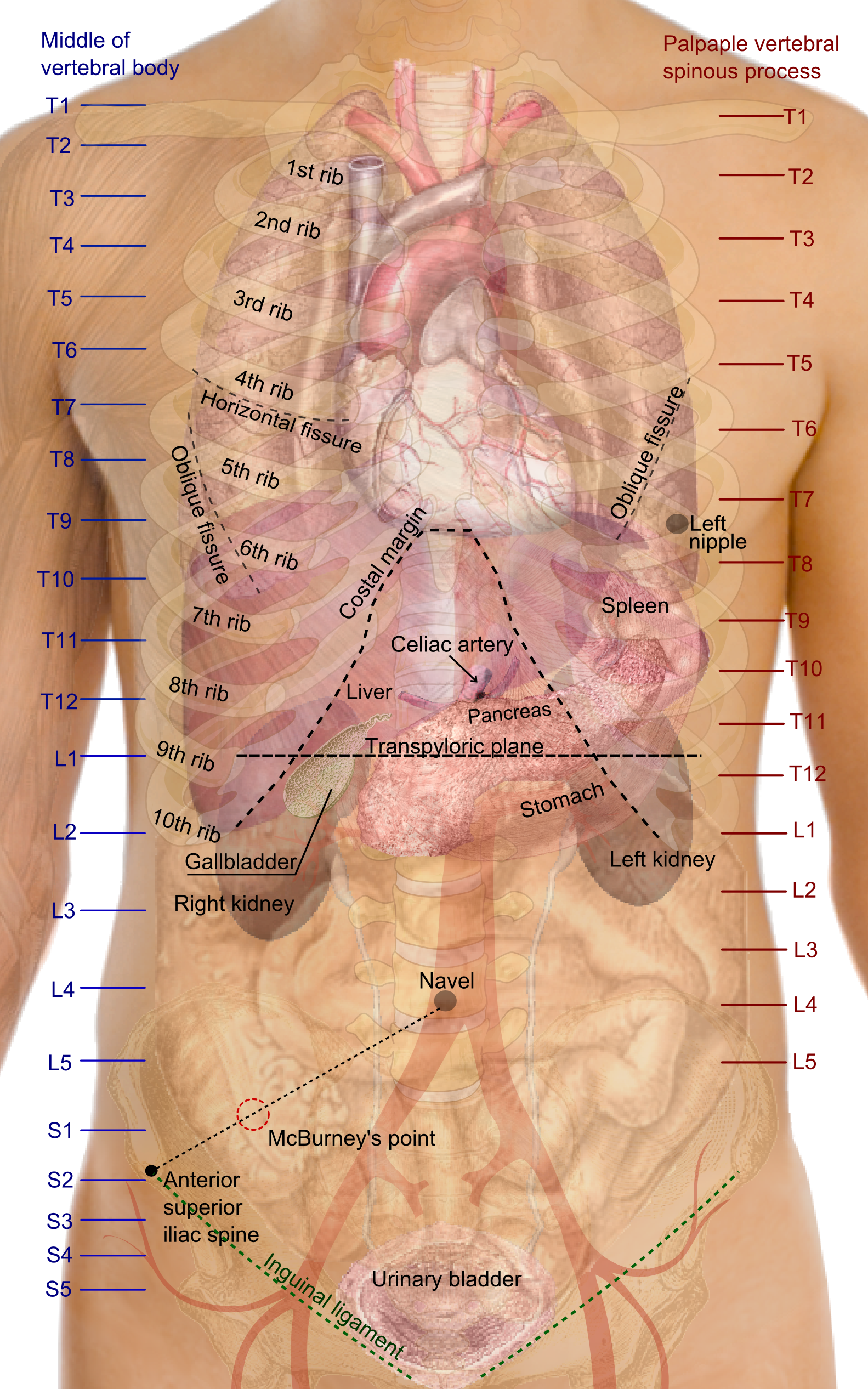
- Surface projections of the major organs of the trunk, showing celiac artery in middle

Details
- Precursor: Vitelline arteries
- Source: Abdominal aorta
- Branches: Left gastric artery common hepatic artery splenic artery

Identifiers
- Latin: truncus coeliacus, arteria coeliaca
- MeSH: D002445
- TA98: A12.2.12.012
- TA2: 4211
- FMA: 50737

The celiac (/ˈsiːli.æk/) artery (also spelled coeliac in British English), also known as the celiac trunk, Haller's tripod or truncus coeliacus, is the first major branch of the abdominal aorta. It is about 1.27 cm (half an inch) in length. Branching from the aorta at the level of the T12-L1 intervertebral disc in typical anatomy, it is one of three anterior/midline branches of the abdominal aorta (the others are the superior and inferior mesenteric arteries).

== Structure ==
The celiac artery is the first major branch of the descending abdominal aorta, branching at a 90° angle. This occurs just below the crus of the diaphragm. In typical anatomy, this is at the T12-L1 vertebral level.

There are three main divisions of the celiac artery, and each in turn has its own named branches:

Artery	Branches
left gastric artery	esophageal branch, stomach branch
common hepatic artery	proper hepatic artery, right gastric artery, gastroduodenal artery
splenic artery	dorsal pancreatic artery, short gastric arteries, left gastro-omental artery, greater pancreatic artery

The celiac artery may also give rise to the inferior phrenic arteries.

== Function ==
The celiac artery supplies oxygenated blood to the liver, stomach, abdominal esophagus, spleen, and the superior half of both the duodenum and the pancreas. These structures correspond to the embryonic foregut. (Similarly, the superior mesenteric artery and inferior mesenteric artery feed structures arising from the embryonic midgut and hindgut respectively. Note that these three anterior branches of the abdominal aorta are distinct and cannot substitute for one another, although there are limited connections between their terminal branches.)

The celiac artery is an essential source of blood, since the interconnections with the other major arteries of the gut are not sufficient to sustain adequate perfusion. Thus it cannot be safely ligated in a living person, and obstruction of the celiac artery will lead to necrosis of the structures it supplies.

=== Drainage ===
The celiac artery is the only major artery that nourishes the abdominal digestive organs that does not have a similarly named vein.

Most blood returning from the digestive organs (including from the area of distribution of the celiac artery) is diverted to the liver via the portal venous system for further processing and detoxification in the liver before returning to the systemic circulation via the hepatic veins.

In contrast to the drainage of midgut and hindgut structures by the superior mesenteric vein and inferior mesenteric vein respectively, venous return from the celiac artery is through either the splenic vein emptying into the hepatic portal vein or via smaller tributaries of the portal venous system.

== Clinical significance ==
Aneurysms in the celiac artery account for around 4% of visceral artery aneurysms. This may cause abdominal pain.

The celiac artery is vulnerable to compression from the crus of the diaphragm during ventilation where it originates from the abdominal aorta. This is known as median arcuate ligament syndrome. This may present no symptoms, but can cause pain due to restricted blood flow to the superior mesenteric artery.

== Additional images ==
Animated volume-rendered CT scan of abdominal and pelvic blood vessels

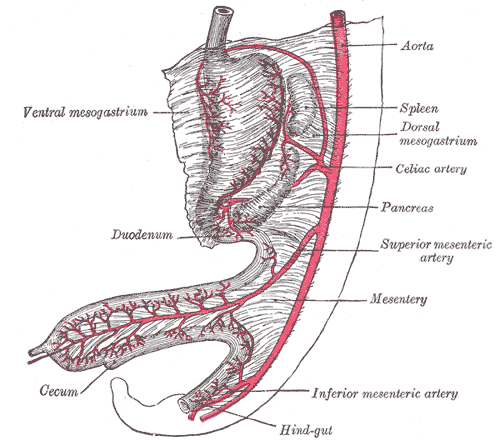
Abdominal part of digestive tube and its attachment to the primitive or common mesentery; human embryo at six weeks

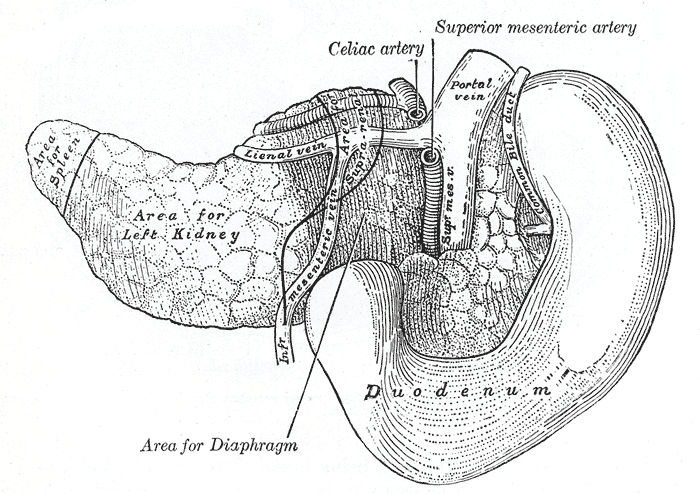
The pancreas and duodenum from behind

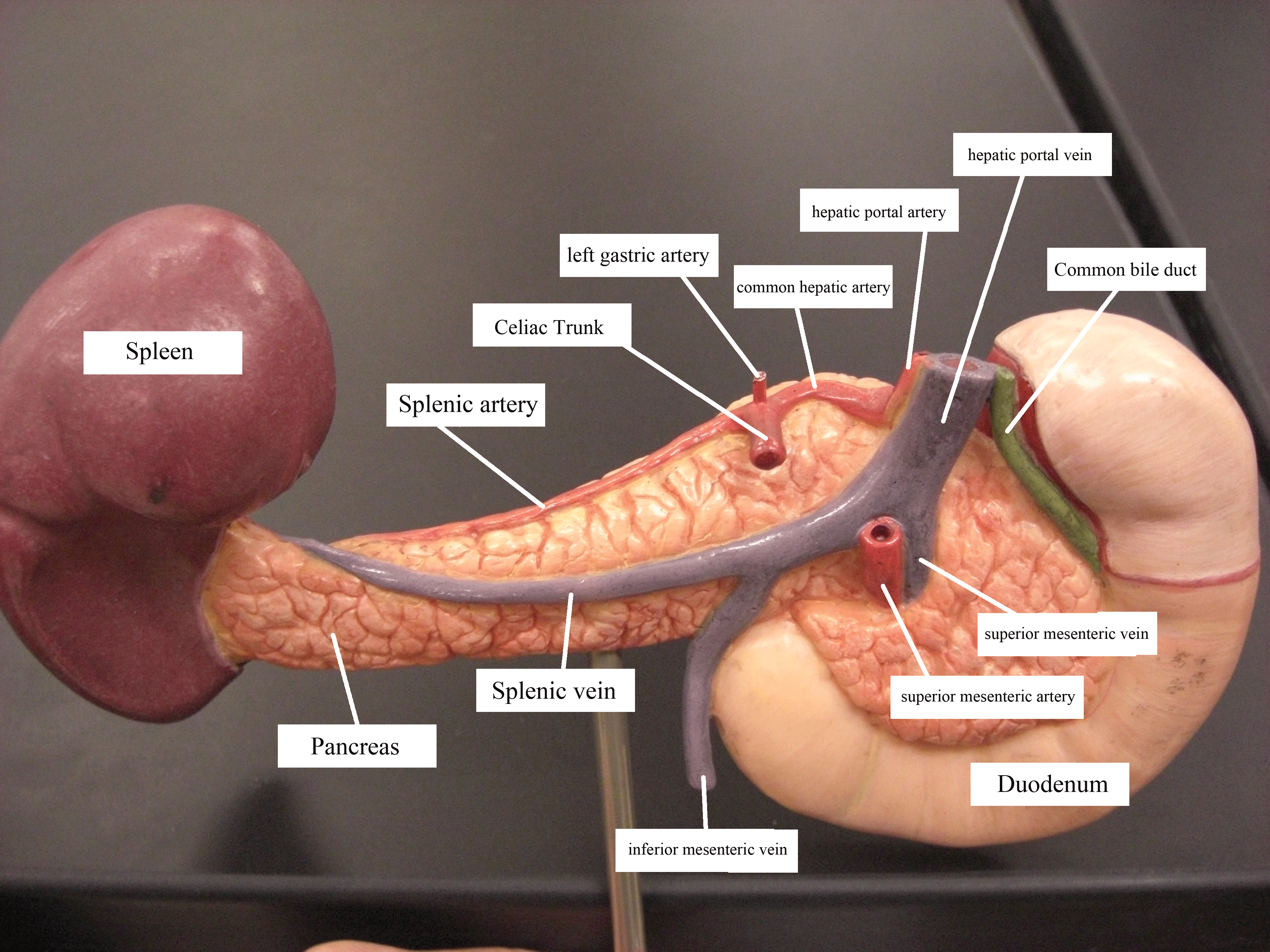
Arteries and veins around the pancreas and spleen

== See also ==
- Celiac artery compression syndrome
