= Left gastroepiploic artery =

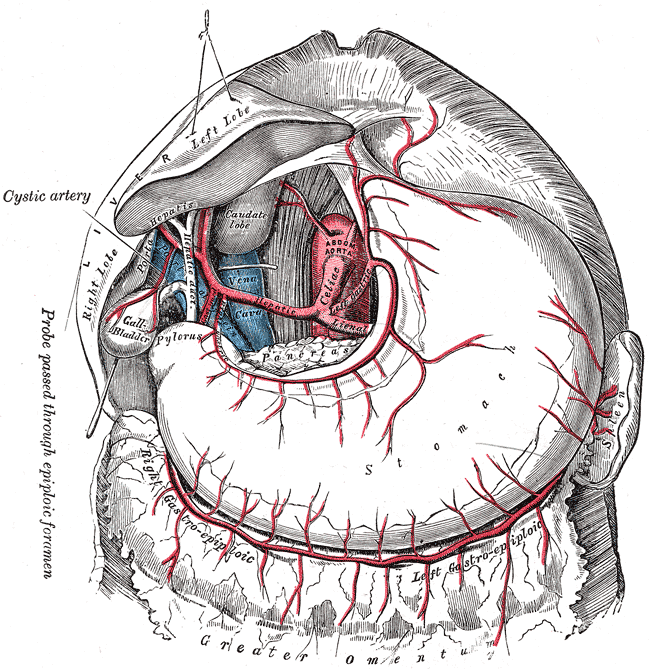
- The celiac artery and its branches; the liver has been raised, and the lesser omentum and anterior layer of the greater omentum removed. (Left gastroepiploic artery visible at lower right.)

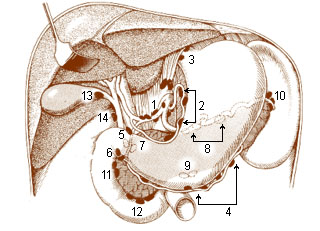
- Right and left gastroomental is at #4.

Details
- Source: Splenic artery
- Vein: Left gastroepiploic vein
- Supplies: Greater curvature of the stomach

Identifiers
- Latin: arteria gastroomentalis sinistra, arteria gastroepiploica sinistra
- TA98: A12.2.12.047
- TA2: 4248
- FMA: 14796

The left gastroepiploic artery (or left gastro-omental artery), the largest branch of the splenic artery, runs from left to right about a finger's breadth or more from the greater curvature of the stomach, between the layers of the greater omentum, and anastomoses with the right gastroepiploic (a branch of the right gastro-duodenal artery originating from the hepatic branch of the coeliac trunk).

In its course it distributes:

- "Gastric branches": several ascending branches to both surfaces of the stomach;
- "Omental branches": descend to supply the greater omentum and anastomose with branches of the middle colic.

== Additional images ==
Blood supply to the stomach: left and right gastric artery, left and right gastro-omental artery and short gastric artery.

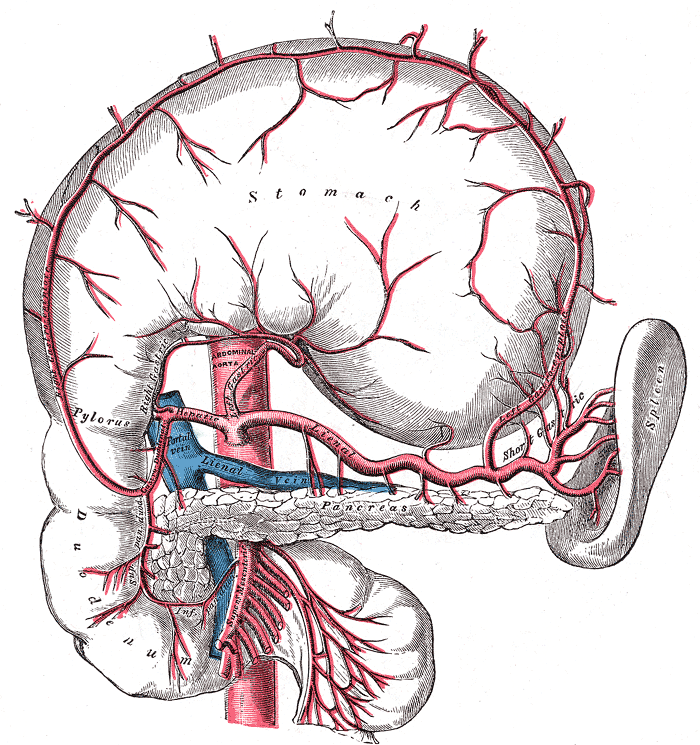
Branches of the celiac artery.
