= Curvatures of the stomach =

Anatomy of the human stomach

- Outline of stomach, showing its anatomical landmarks

Details
- Artery: Greater: short gastric (upper part), left gastroepiploic (middle); Lesser: right gastric artery and left gastric artery
- Vein: Lesser: right gastric vein and left gastric vein

Identifiers
- Latin: curvatura major gastris, curvatura minor gastris
- TA98: A05.5.01.004
- TA2: 2904
- FMA: 14574

The curvatures of the stomach are the long, convex, lateral surface, and the shorter, concave, medial surface of the stomach, which are referred to as the greater and lesser curvatures, respectively. The greater curvature, which begins at the cardiac notch, and arches backwards, passing inferiorly to the left, is four or five times longer than the lesser curvature, which attaches to the hepatogastric ligament and is supplied by the left gastric artery and right gastric branch of the hepatic artery.

== Greater curvature ==
The greater curvature of the stomach forms the lower left or lateral border of the stomach. Starting from the cardiac orifice it begins at the cardiac notch, forming an arch backward, upward, and to the left. A horizontal plane across from the cardiac notch encloses an area called the fundus of the stomach. The highest point of the fundic convex is on a level with the sixth left costal cartilage. The greater curvature continues downward and forward, with a slight convexity to the left as low as the cartilage of the ninth rib; it then turns to the right, to the end of the pylorus.

Directly opposite the angular incisure (incisura angularis) of the lesser curvature the greater curvature presents a dilatation, which is the left extremity of the pyloric part; this dilatation is limited on the right by a slight groove, the sulcus intermedius, which is about 2.5 cm from the pyloric sphincter.

The portion between the sulcus intermedius and the pyloric sphincter is termed the pyloric antrum.

At its commencement the greater curvature is covered by peritoneum continuous with that covering the front of the organ.

The left part of the curvature gives attachment to the gastrosplenic ligament, while its anterior portion is attached to the two layers of the greater omentum, separated from each other by the gastroepiploic vessels.

== Lesser curvature ==
The lesser curvature of the stomach forms the upper right or medial border of the stomach. The lesser curvature of the stomach travels between the cardiac and pyloric orifices. It descends as a continuation of the right margin of the esophagus in front of the fibers of the right crus of the diaphragm, and then, turning to the right, it crosses the first lumbar vertebra and ends at the pylorus.

Nearer its pyloric end than its cardiac end is a well-marked small notch, the angular incisure, or angular notch, which varies somewhat in position with the state of distension of the stomach. It serves to separate the stomach into a right and a left portion; or if a line is drawn through it, it makes the boundary between the body and the pylorus of the stomach.

The lesser curvature gives attachment to the two layers of the hepatogastric ligament – part of the lesser omentum, and between these two layers are the left gastric artery and the right gastric branch of the hepatic artery.

== Blood supply ==
Arteries that primarily supply the greater curvature are the short gastric arteries that supply the upper part, the gastric branches of the left gastroepiploic artery (middle part), and the right gastroepiploic artery (lower part).

== Additional images ==
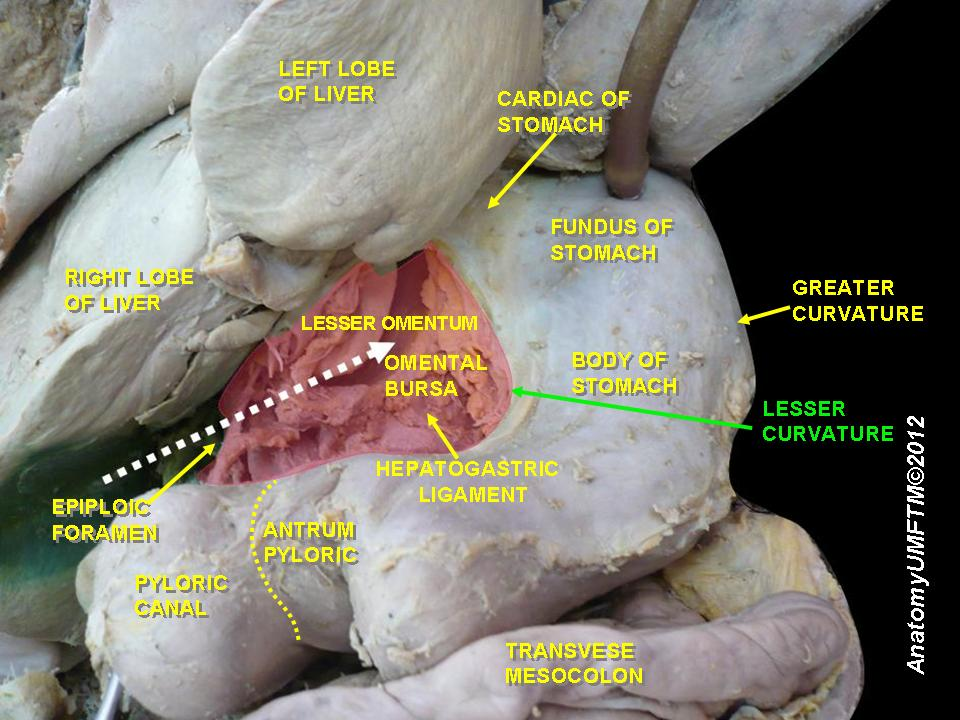
Lesser curvature

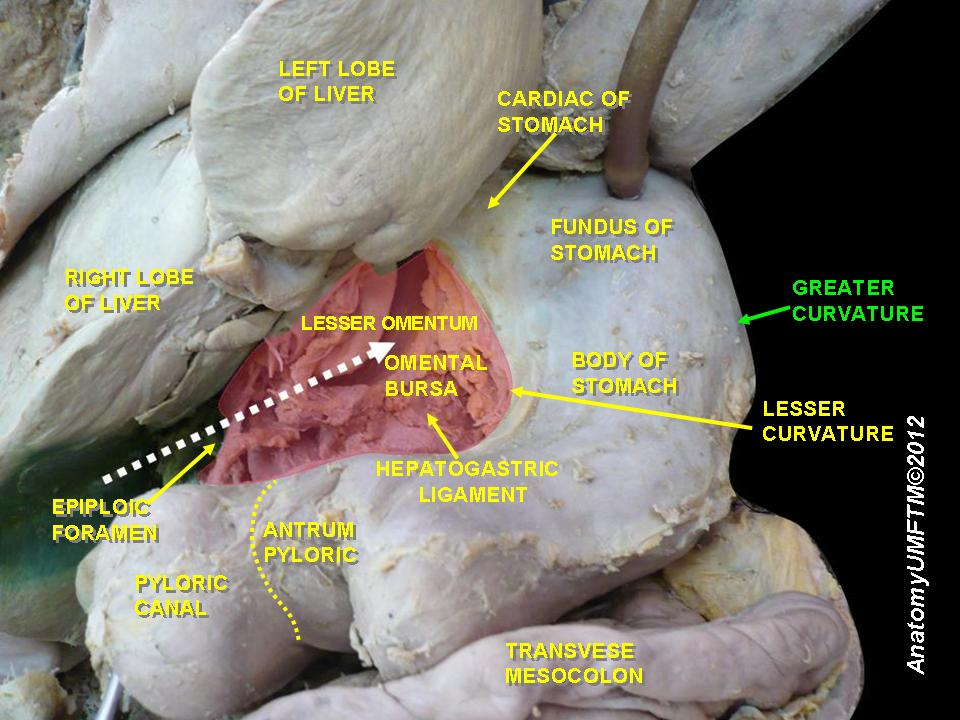
Greater curvature

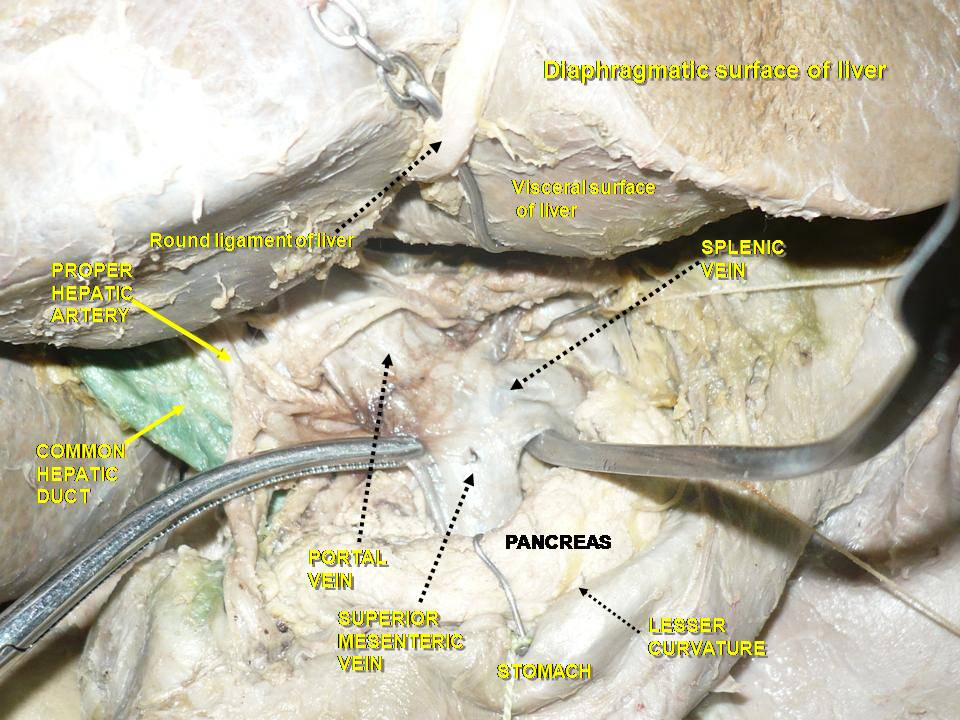
Stomach. Lesser curvature. Deep dissection.

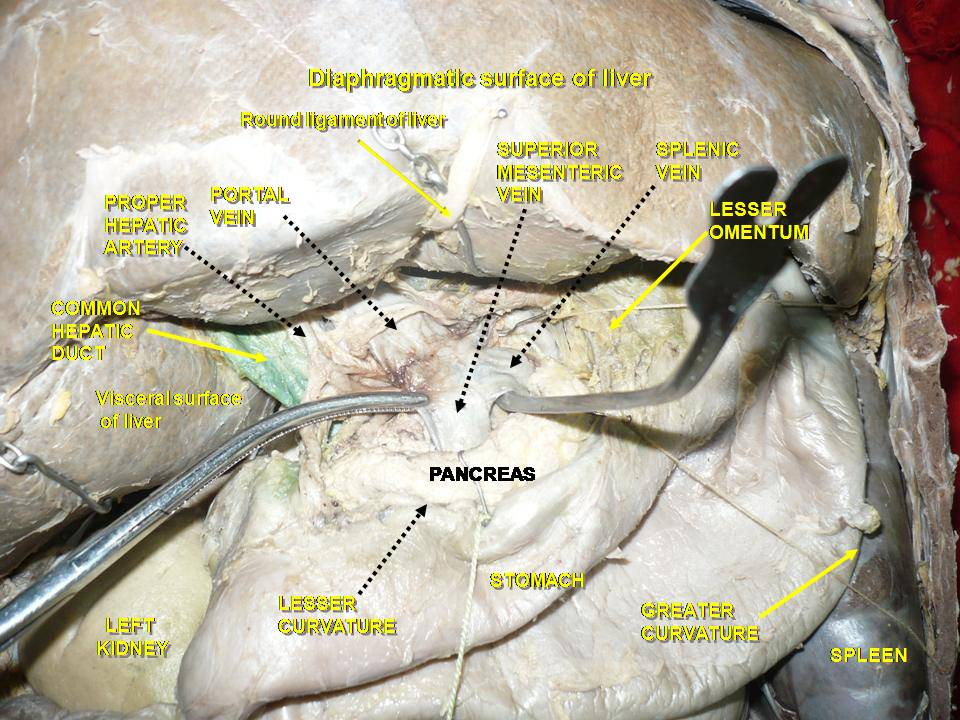
Stomach. Greater curvature. Deep dissection.
