= Balloon-occluded retrograde transvenous obliteration =

Medical procedure used to treat gastric varices

- Other names: BRTO
- Specialty: Interventional radiology

Balloon-occluded retrograde transvenous obliteration (BRTO) is an endovascular procedure used for the treatment of gastric varices. When performing the procedure, an interventional radiologist accesses blood vessels using a catheter, inflates a balloon (e.g. balloon occlusion) and injects a substance into the variceal blood vessels that causes blockage of those vessels. To prevent the flow of the agent out of the intended site (variceal blood vessels), a balloon is inflated during the procedure, which occludes.

== Medical uses ==
BRTO is used for the treatment of bleeding from gastric varices. In addition to transjugular intrahepatic portosystemic shunt (TIPS), BRTO is a first line treatment for the prevention of recurrent bleeding from gastric varices (GOV2 or IGV1). BRTO may be used for the treatment of ectopic varices.

== Complications ==
As BRTO results in a blockage of a portosystemic shunt, the procedure may result in increased portal hypertension, which may worsen esophageal varices or ascites.

== History ==
BRTO was developed as a procedure in the early 1990s. Initially, the procedure was performed using ethanolamine oleate as a sclerosant. Between 2006 and 2007, American physicians began using sodium tetradecyl sulfate (3% STS) as an alternative sclerosing agent.

== See also ==
- Transjugular intrahepatic portosystemic shunt
- Distal splenorenal shunt procedure
- Portal venous system
