= Portacaval anastomosis =

- Other names: Porto-systemic anastomosis Portal caval system

A portacaval anastomosis or portocaval anastomosis is a specific type of circulatory anastomosis that occurs between the veins of the portal circulation and the vena cava, thus forming one of the principal types of portasystemic anastomosis or portosystemic anastomosis, as it connects the portal circulation to the systemic circulation, providing an alternative pathway for the blood. When there is a blockage of the portal system, portocaval anastomosis enables the blood to still reach the systemic venous circulation. The inferior end of the esophagus and the superior part of the rectum are potential sites of a harmful portocaval anastomosis.

In portal hypertension, as in the case of cirrhosis of the liver, the anastomoses become congested and form venous dilatations. Such dilatation can lead to esophageal varices and anorectal varices. Caput medusae can also result.

A portacaval shunt is analogous in that it diverts circulation; as with shunts and anastomoses generally, the terms are often used to refer to either the naturally occurring forms or the surgically created forms.

== Presentation ==
Clinical presentations of portal hypertension include:

Region	Name of clinical condition	Portal circulation	Systemic circulation
Esophageal	Esophageal varices	Esophageal branch of left gastric vein	Esophageal branches of azygos vein
Rectal	Rectal varices	Superior rectal vein	Middle rectal veins and inferior rectal veins
Paraumbilical	Caput medusae	Paraumbilical veins	Superficial epigastric vein
Retroperitoneal	Splenorenal shunt	Splenic vein	Renal vein, suprarenal vein, paravertebral vein, and gonadal vein
Retroperitoneal	(no clinical name)	Right colic vein, middle colic vein, left colic vein	Retroperitoneal veins of Retzius
Intrahepatic	Hepatic pseudolesions	Perihepatic veins of Sappey	Superior epigastric vein
Intrahepatic	Patent ductus venosus	Left branch of portal vein	Inferior vena cava

A dilated inferior mesenteric vein may or may not be related to portal hypertension. Other areas of anastomosis include the bare area of the liver as it connects to the diaphragm, the posterior portion of the gastrointestinal tract as it touches the posterior abdominal wall, and the inferior part of the esophagus.
