= Gastroesophageal varices =

Gastroesophageal varices may refer to:

- Esophageal varices, dilated sub-mucosal veins in esophagus
- Gastric varices, dilated submucosal veins in the stomach
