= Portacaval shunt =

Surgical shunt to divert blood away from liver

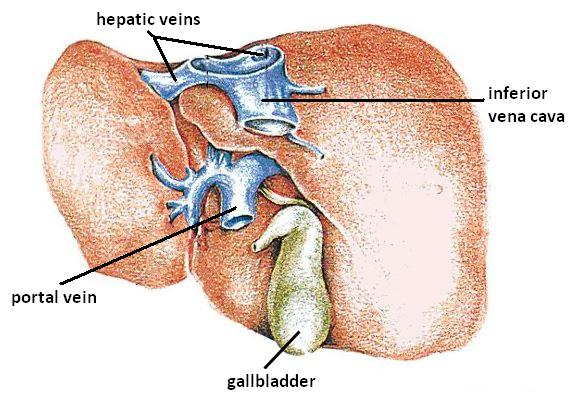
- Under normal conditions, blood flows into the liver via the portal vein and exits through the hepatic vein, eventually reaching the inferior vena cava. A portacaval shunt connects the portal vein directly to the inferior vena cava, bypassing the liver entirely.

A portacaval shunt, portocaval shunt, or portal-caval shunt is a surgical procedure where a connection (a shunt) is made between the portal vein and the inferior vena cava.

Under normal circumstances, the portal vein drains blood from the abdomen to the liver. The blood is deoxygenated and carries nutrients and waste products from the intestines, spleen, pancreas, and gallbladder to the liver. The deoxygenated blood then exits the liver through the hepatic vein and empties into the inferior vena cava, the vein that carries blood from the lower two-thirds of the body to the heart.

The portacaval shunt connects the portal vein to the inferior vena cava, allowing blood to travel directly from the portal vein to the inferior vena cava, bypassing the liver entirely. The shunt is typically used to manage complications of portal hypertension, such as upper gastrointestinal bleeding. However, technological advancements have shifted towards minimally invasive methods rather than surgical shunting.

Portal hypertension is commonly seen with liver cirrhosis and/or other liver diseases such as Budd–Chiari syndrome, primary biliary cirrhosis (PBC), and portal vein thrombosis. The purpose of the shunt is to divert blood flow away from the liver, reducing the high pressure in the portal venous system and decreasing the risk of bleeding.

A portacaval anastomosis is analogous in that it diverts circulation; as with shunts and anastomoses generally, the terms are often used to refer to either the naturally occurring forms or the surgically created forms.

== History ==
Portacaval shunts were first developed and performed in the mid-20th century to control bleeding varicose veins in cases of portal hypertension. These efforts successfully controlled the bleeding; however, liver failure remained a concern and often worsened after shunt placement. Eventually, selective shunts were introduced, and soon liver transplantation became the definitive surgical solution to treating portal hypertension.

Over time, less invasive treatments for portal hypertension were developed. Sclerotherapy, a minimally invasive procedure that uses chemicals to shrink varicose veins through endoscopy, was later enhanced with the introduction of variceal band ligation. Technological advancements also led to pharmacological therapies and interventional radiologic procedures like transjugular intrahepatic portosystemic shunt (TIPS), which is now the preferred treatment for managing portal hypertension. Portacaval shunting is no longer commonly used as the first line treatment for variceal bleeding due to the increased safety and effectiveness of the newer treatments.

== Indications ==
Portacaval shunting is primarily indicated for uncontrolled upper gastrointestinal bleeding when medical therapy, endoscopic methods, or TIPS are not possible or ineffective. Additionally, surgical shunting may also be indicated for patients with a history of splenectomy, splenic vein or hepatic vein thrombosis, a splenorenal shunt, or ascites, as minimally invasive methods would not be recommended in these cases.

The purpose of the shunt is to redirect blood flow from the portal venous system into the systemic venous system, which reduces the pressure gradient in the portal venous circulation, thereby lowering the risk of bleeding varices.

== Types of shunt ==
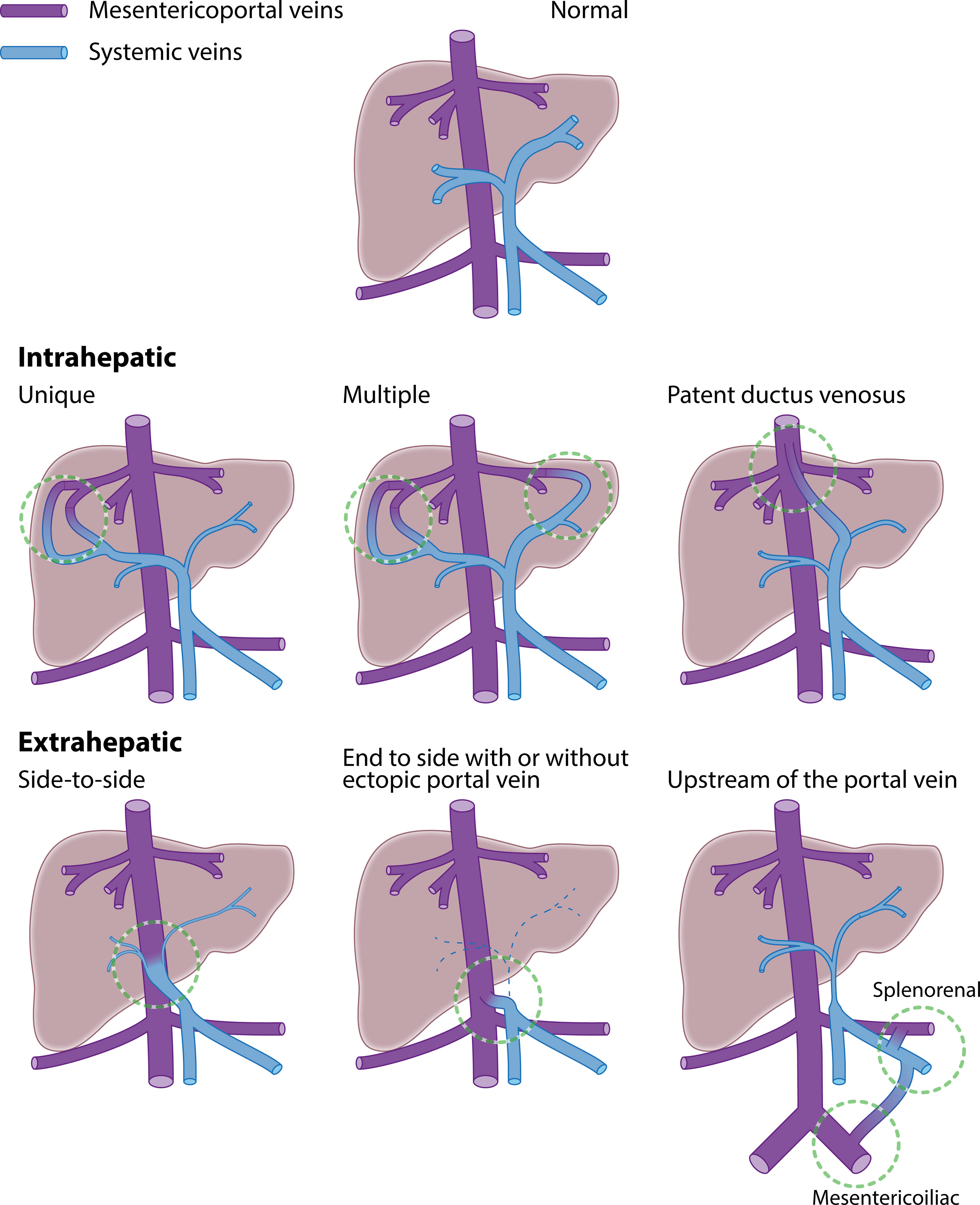
The side-to-side and end-to-side portacaval shunts are extrahepatic shunts shown in the lower left of the image.

Several types of shunts connect the portal circulation to the systemic venous circulation. The portacaval shunt specifically connects the portal vein to the inferior vena cava through a direct connection. There are two major types of portacaval shunts.

- Side-to-side portacaval shunt: connects the side of the portal vein to the side of the inferior vena cava, creating a parallel bypass. The side-to-side shunt preserves some blood flow to the liver due to the connection being more upstream of the portal vein vs at the end of the portal vein. The side-to-side shunt is often preferred in the management of refractory ascites associated with the portal hypertension.
- End-to-side portacaval shunt: connects the end of the portal vein to the side of the inferior vena cava, creating a new connection between the two vessels. The end-to-side may be used if the patient's anatomy calls for it.

Both surgical procedures reduce portal venous pressure by diverting blood flow away from the portal venous circulation and into the systemic venous circulation.

== Outcomes ==
The success rate depends on several factors, including the patient's condition and the severity of the disease. Studies have shown that surgical shunting is highly effective in controlling upper gastrointestinal bleeding. The Child–Pugh score can be used to help determine the severity and prognosis of patients with severe liver disease. Additionally, factors such as the event's timing, whether an emergent or elective procedure is performed, and the technical success of the surgical procedure can affect the outcomes and prognosis.

== Risks and complications ==
The primary complication of the procedure is hepatic encephalopathy (HE), a cognitive dysfunction caused by the liver's reduced ability to filter toxins from the blood. Signs of symptoms of HE include confusion, disorientation, impaired memory, changes to mood, lethargy, and asterixis.

Patients that undergo portacaval shunting may have an increased risk of HE because blood bypasses the liver and allows unfiltered toxins to enter the bloodstream and reach the brain, causing cognitive dysfunction. Additionally, increased intestinal absorption of encephalopathogenic substances in combination with reduced hepatic blood flow may also contribute to the high risk of developing HE. Surgical shunts have a higher risk of encephalopathy compared to less invasive measures due to the total redirect of blood flow away from the liver.

There are general surgical risks, such as bleeding and infection, along with specific complications related to liver function with portacaval shunting. Compared to the less invasive approaches (endoscopy, TIPS), surgical shunts have an increased risk of morbidity and mortality, especially in patients with advanced disease. Complications include liver dysfunction due to altered blood flow, shunt thrombosis, and hepatic insufficiency.

== Alternatives ==
Alternatives to surgical portacaval shunts include:

- Transjugular intrahepatic portosystemic shunt (TIPS)
- Endoscopic sclerotherapy or variceal band ligation
- Balloon tamponade
- Beta-blockers and other medical management
- Liver transplantation

An interventional radiologist typically performs TIPS, which involves placing a stent between the portal vein and hepatic veins to lower blood pressure in the portal circulation. Compared to portacaval shunting, TIPS is less invasive, safer, and is now the preferred option for patients with advanced liver failure or those at high surgical risk.

Both TIPS and portacaval shunting effectively reduce portal pressure but share the risk of hepatic encephalopathy (HE) due to bypassing the liver's detoxification process. In TIPS, HE symptoms can often be managed by adjusting the stent, whereas portacaval shunting provides a permanent solution without the ability to make such adjustments.

Additionally, portacaval shunting carries significantly higher morbidity and mortality rates, making TIPS the more favorable option in most cases.
