= Sugiura procedure =

Surgical procedure

- Specialty: Gastroenterology

The Sugiura procedure is a surgical technique that involves the removal and transection of the blood vessels that supply the upper portion of the stomach and the esophagus. The procedure also involves a splenectomy. The operation was originally developed to treat bleeding esophageal varices (commonly a complication of liver cirrhosis) that were untreatable by other conventional methods. It was originally developed as a two-step operation, but has been modified numerous times by many surgeons since its original creation.

== Introduction ==
The Sugiura procedure was originally developed to treat bleeding esophageal varices and consisted mainly of an esophagogastric devascularization. It was developed in Japan in 1973 as a nonshunting technique that achieved variceal bleeding hemostasis by interrupting the variceal blood flow along the gastroesophageal junction. The procedure consists primarily of paraesophagogastric devascularization achieved by dividing the perforating veins of the esophagus and the stomach while maintaining the plexus of collaterals that connect the coronary gastric vein to the azygous system. The original procedure also consisted of an esophageal transection, splenectomy, vagotomy, and pyloroplasty.

The Sugiura procedure was originally associated with significant morbidity and mortality; in recent years, though, this procedure and its modifications have been performed in many hepatobiliary and pancreatic surgical centers with improving morbidity and mortality rates.

== Indications ==
=== Elective procedure ===
The modified Sugiura procedure is indicated in patients with well-preserved liver function (Child-Pugh class A or B without chronic ascites) and who are not candidates for transjugular intrahepatic portosystemic shunt, distal splenorenal shunt, or liver transplantation.

=== Emergent procedure ===
Emergency Sugiura procedure is indicated when Child-Pugh class A or B cirrhotic patients are acutely bleeding from gastroesophageal varices that are not responsive to medical or radiological therapies.

== Pediatrics ==
A study of 15 children, aged 2–12 years old who all had multiple episodes of severe esophageal bleeding varices, and a mean follow-up time of 10 years 4 months, demonstrated 0% mortality and 80% resolution with disappearance of the varices and no evidence of recurrent bleeding. No cases of esophageal stenosis, gastroesophageal reflux disease, hiatal hernia, encephalopathy or hepatic dysfunction were documented. The Sugiura procedure is a safe and effective surgical treatment of esophageal varices in the pediatric population.

== Procedure ==
=== Original technique ===
The original technique described by Sugiura and Futagawa was a two-step operation consisting of an initial thoracic operation followed by the abdominal operation 3–4 weeks later. The thoracic operation consists of an extensive paraesophageal devascularization up to the inferior pulmonary vein and esophageal transection. The abdominal operation consists of a splenectomy, devascularization of the abdominal esophagus and cardia, and a selective vagotomy with pyloroplasty.

=== Thoracic operation ===
Access is gained through a left lateral thoracotomy incision below the sixth rib. The inferior mediastinum is exposed to the level of the anterior aspect of the descending aorta. All of the shunting veins that direct blood to the collateral veins from the esophagus are ligated, taking special consideration to preserving the extraesophageal systemic venous collaterals (azygous veins). Usually between 30 and 50 shunting veins are present. Once devascularization is complete, the esophagus is clamped in two areas with esophageal clamps, and esophageal transection is done at the level of the diaphragm. The anterior muscular and mucosal layers are divided, but the posterior layer is left intact. Sutures are then placed and the divided varices are occluded. The muscle layer is then reattached. A nasogastric tube is left in situ, and the mediastinum is closed.

=== Abdominal operation ===
Access is gained through an upper midline incision with left lateral extension. Splenectomy is then performed. The abdominal esophagus is devascularized from the stomach. The posterior gastric vagus nerve requires ligation due to its close proximity. The lesser curvature of the stomach and abdominal esophagus are then devascularized, and the cardioesophageal branches of the left gastric vessels are ligated and divided. The esophagus and cardia are then entirely mobilized. The anterior gastric vagus nerve was previously divided and therefore pyloroplasty is performed. A drain is inserted in the surgical cavity and the incision is closed.

=== Modified Sugiura procedure ===
Since the majority of documented Sugiura procedures performed outside Japan failed to achieve the exceptionally low mortality and morbidity rates, various authors have proposed modifications to make the procedure less complex. One common modification uses a single abdominal operation to achieve gastroesophageal devascularization. A splenectomy is initially performed and is followed by devascularization of the distal esophagus through the diaphragm hiatus and the superior two-thirds of the major and lesser gastric curve taking careful consideration to not ligate the left gastric vein. To ensure complete separation of the azygous vein system from the intramucosal venous plexus, an end-to-end anastomosing stapling device transects and anastomosis a region of the esophagus 4–6 cm above the gastroesophageal junction. This anastomosis can then be reinforced with vicryl suture. A pyloroplasty is routinely followed to facilitate gastric emptying.

== Morbidity and mortality ==
Early experience with the Sugiura procedure demonstrated, following the procedures, the overall operative mortality was 32% and overall morbidity occurred in 33% of the patients. Significant causes of morbidity and mortality were related to complications of the esophageal transection as anastomotic leakage occurred in 8.6% of patients undergoing emergent surgery versus 4.8% in elective cases. All patients who developed an esophageal leak died. For this reason, modification of the original procedure was introduced to avoid the risk of perioperative mortality due to esophageal transection.

Retrospective analyses of patients who received the Sugiura procedure between 1967 and 1984 for either elective, emergency, or prophylactic setting demonstrate that operative mortality was greatest in the emergency setting (13.3%), followed by prophylactic (3.9%) and elective surgery (3.0%).

== Outcomes ==
Recent reports of selected patients undergoing Sugiura procedure reported that recurrence of gastroesophageal variceal bleeding occurs in only 2.3% of patients.
