= Shunt (medical) =

Hole or passage within the human body that allows fluids to move throughout it

Auscultogram from normal and abnormal heart sounds

In medicine, a shunt is a hole or a small passage that moves, or allows movement of, fluid from one part of the body to another. The term may describe either congenital or acquired shunts; acquired shunts (sometimes referred to as iatrogenic shunts) may be either biological or mechanical.

== Types ==
- Cardiac shunts may be described as right-to-left, left-to-right or bidirectional, or as systemic-to-pulmonary or pulmonary-to-systemic.
- Cerebral shunt: In cases of hydrocephalus and other conditions that cause chronic increased intracranial pressure, a one-way valve is used to drain excess cerebrospinal fluid from the brain and carry it to other parts of the body. This valve usually sits outside the skull but beneath the skin, somewhere behind the ear. Cerebral shunts that drain fluid to the peritoneal cavity (located in the upper abdomen) are called ventriculoperitoneal (VP) shunts.
- Lumbar-peritoneal shunt (a.k.a. lumboperitoneal, LP): In cases of chronic increased intracranial pressure such as idiopathic intracranial hypertension and hydrocephalus, a tube or shunt with or without a one-way valve is used to drain the excess cerebrospinal fluid from the brain and transport it to the peritoneal cavity. Unlike the ventriculoperitoneal shunt, however, a lumbar-peritoneal shunt is usually inserted in between two of the vertebrae in the lumbar and punctures the cerebrospinal fluid sack or lumbar subarachnoid space, it then runs beneath the skin to the peritoneal cavity, where it is eventually drained away by the normal bodily fluid drainage system.
- A Peritoneovenous shunt: (also called Denver shunt) is a shunt which drains peritoneal fluid from the peritoneum into veins, usually the internal jugular vein or the superior vena cava. It is sometimes used in patients with refractory ascites. It is a long tube with a non-return valve running subcutaneously from the peritoneum to the internal jugular vein in the neck, which allows ascitic fluid to pass directly into the systemic circulation. Possible compilations include bleeding from varices, disseminated intravascular coagulation, infection, superior vena caval thrombosis and pulmonary edema.
- Pulmonary shunts exist when there is normal perfusion to an alveolus, but ventilation fails to supply the perfused region.
- A portosystemic shunt (PSS), also known as a liver shunt, is a bypass of the liver by the body's circulatory system. It can be either a congenital or acquired condition. Congenital PSS is an uncommon condition in dogs and cats, found mainly in small dog breeds such as Miniature Schnauzers and Yorkshire Terriers, and in cats such as Persians, Himalayans, and mix breeds. Acquired PSS is also uncommon and is found in older dogs with liver disease causing portal hypertension, especially cirrhosis.
- A portacaval shunt (portal caval shunt) is a treatment for high blood pressure in the liver.
- A transjugular intrahepatic portosystemic shunt (TIPS) is an artificial channel within the liver that establishes communication between the inflow portal vein and the outflow hepatic vein. It is used to treat portal hypertension.
- VASP (Vesicoamniotic shunting procedure): Fetal lower urinary tract outflow obstruction prevents the unborn baby from passing urine. This can result in a reduction in the volume of amniotic fluid, and problems with the development of the baby's lungs and kidneys. A vesico–amniotic shunt is a tube that it is inserted into the unborn baby's bladder to drain the excess fluid into the surrounding space.
