= Splendrillia masinoi =

Scientific classification
- Kingdom: Animalia
- Phylum: Mollusca
- Class: Gastropoda
- Subclass: Caenogastropoda
- Order: Neogastropoda
- Superfamily: Conoidea
- Family: Drilliidae
- Genus: Splendrillia
- Species: S. masinoi

Binomial name
- Splendrillia masinoi Fallon, 2016

Species of gastropod

Splendrillia masinoi is a species of sea snail, a marine gastropod mollusk in the family Drilliidae.

== Description ==
The length of the shell attains 11 mm with 9 angular whorls. The predominant sculpture is axial ribs, oval aperture and short anterior canal. It has a protoconch of 2 smooth and round whorls but the first whorl isn't immersed into the second. The axial sculpture consists of strong ribs that run from suture to suture to the anterior fasciole on the last whorl that's lower, narrower and slightly recurved on the shoulders. The rib crests are narrower on the shoulder but broader on the whorl periphery. The space between ribs are about wide as the ribs and there's 8-11 ribs on the penultimate whorl. Strong growth rate striae run obliquely over the ribs and are recurved over the whorl's shoulder. The spiral sculpture consists of 6 spiral ridges on the anterior fasciole besides growth striae as the shell surface was rather smooth under a dissecting microscope. The shell has a pattern of punctae in rows with some regularly spaced and others not very regularly spaced in SEM photos at the zoom of 1,000x. However, the occasional row of joined punctae as seen in other Splendrillia species wasn't observed on this exact species. The sulcus is concave with recurved ribs and the striae marks the prior positions on the anal sinus. The varix is broad and hump-like that's about ⅓ turn from the edge of the outer lip that's based on the length of the outer scar and the position of the parietal callus. The data for the anal sinus is mostly unknown for this species. The inner lip of the shell is thick and detached anteriorly and it's thin on the parietal wall that's formed into a parietal callus posteriorly. The anal canal of the snail is open but unnotched and the anterior fasciole is slightly swollen for this specimen. The color of the shell is off-white with 2 reddish-brown spirals with one below the whorl periphery and the other is very faint but close to the anterior fasciole and axial streaks between the ribs that's giving the appearance of pencilled squares on the shell base. A white band is present on the whorl shoulder and the aperture and shell apex is white. A large reddish-brown patch is visible on the varix shoulder above a reddish-brown spiral line.

== Distribution ==
This marine species occurs in the Caribbean Sea off Curaçao.
