= Splendrillia alabastrum =

Scientific classification
- Kingdom: Animalia
- Phylum: Mollusca
- Class: Gastropoda
- Subclass: Caenogastropoda
- Order: Neogastropoda
- Superfamily: Conoidea
- Family: Drilliidae
- Genus: Splendrillia
- Species: S. alabastrum

Binomial name
- Splendrillia alabastrum Kilburn, 1988

Species of gastropod

Splendrillia alabastrum is a species of sea snail, a marine gastropod mollusk in the family Drilliidae.

== Description ==
The small, white shell has a biconic-claviform shape. Its length attains 8.7 mm, its diameter 3.7 mm. The protoconch consists of two rounded and smooth whorls, the teleoconch of 5 whorls. The shoulder is relatively weak. The suture is moderately deep. The body whorl has an inverted cone shape. The dorsum is not prominently humped and lacks a definite varix. The siphonal canal is narrow and moderately deep. The axial sculpture shows slightly opisthocline (= backward-slanted) ribs that are wider than the intervals and reach the lower suture. The ribs number 10 or more on the penultimate whorl. The columella is not noticeably convex. The outer lip is somewhat flattened in the middle.

== Distribution ==
This marine species occurs in the demersal zone off Transkei, South Africa, at depths between 410 m and 430 m.
