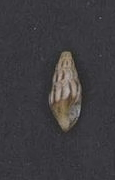
- Shell of Psittacodrillia bairstowi (museum specimen at Naturalis Biodiversity Center)

Scientific classification
- Kingdom: Animalia
- Phylum: Mollusca
- Class: Gastropoda
- Subclass: Caenogastropoda
- Order: Neogastropoda
- Superfamily: Conoidea
- Family: Horaiclavidae
- Genus: Psittacodrillia
- Species: P. bairstowi

Binomial name
- Psittacodrillia bairstowi (Sowerby III, 1886)

Synonyms
- Clionella bairstowi (G. B. Sowerby III, 1886); Crassispira bairstowi (Sowerby III, 1886); Drillia bairstowi (G. B. Sowerby III, 1886); Marginella bairstowi (E. A. Smith, 1882); Pleurotoma bairstowi Sowerby III, 1886; Pleurotoma (Clionella) bairstowi (G. B. Sowerby III, 1886)

= Psittacodrillia bairstowi =

Species of gastropod

Psittacodrillia bairstowi is a species of sea snail, a marine gastropod mollusk in the family Horaiclavidae.

== Description ==
The length of the shell varies between 9 mm and 12 mm.

The characters of the shell resemble those of Psittacodrillia albonodulosa (Smith E. A., 1904), but the fifth whorl has 11 axial ribs. Its color is white with dark reddish streaks between the ribs. The apex is pailliform. The shell shows spiral threads overall.

== Distribution ==
This marine species occurs off False Bay – North Transkei, South Africa.
