= Splendrillia kylix =

Scientific classification
- Kingdom: Animalia
- Phylum: Mollusca
- Class: Gastropoda
- Subclass: Caenogastropoda
- Order: Neogastropoda
- Superfamily: Conoidea
- Family: Drilliidae
- Genus: Splendrillia
- Species: S. kylix

Binomial name
- Splendrillia kylix Kilburn, 1988

Species of gastropod

Splendrillia kylix is a species of sea snail, a marine gastropod mollusk in the family Drilliidae.

== Description ==
The small, grayish-white shell has a claviform shape and a silky gloss. Its length attains 10.1 mm, its diameter 4.1 mm. The protoconch consists of two rounded and smooth whorls (with a relatively large and blunt apex), the teleoconch of 5 whorls. The shoulder is strong and its angle is not sharp. The suture is moderately deep. The body whorl has an inverted cone shape. The dorsum is not prominently humped and lacks a definite varix. The anal sinus is wide. The siphonal canal is narrow and moderately deep. The axial sculpture shows slightly opisthocline (= backward-slanted) ribs that are wider than the intervals and do not reach the lower suture. The ribs number 10 to 16 on the penultimate whorl. The columella is not noticeably convex. The outer lip is somewhat flattened in the middle.

== Distribution ==
This marine species occurs off Transkei, South Africa.
