= Hematemesis =

Vomiting of blood

- Other names: Haematemesis
- Specialty: General surgery, gastroenterology
- Symptoms: Vomiting bright blood
- Causes: Hemorrhoid; Gastritis; Gastrointestinal bleeding Stomach cancer Septicemic plague
- Diagnostic method: Endoscopy
- Differential diagnosis: Epistaxis, hemoptysis

Hematemesis is the vomiting of blood. It can be confused with hemoptysis (coughing up blood) or epistaxis (nosebleed), which are more common. The source is generally the upper gastrointestinal tract, typically above the suspensory muscle of duodenum. It may be caused by ulcers, tumors of the stomach or esophagus, varices, prolonged and vigorous retching, gastroenteritis, ingested blood (from bleeding in the mouth, nose, or throat), or certain drugs. However, this is not found in stomach viruses (norovirus, rotovirus, etc.)

Hematemesis is treated as a medical emergency, with treatments based on the amount of blood loss. Investigations include endoscopy. Any blood loss may be corrected with intravenous fluids and blood transfusions. Patients may need to avoid taking anything by mouth.

== Definition ==
Hematemesis is the vomiting of blood. This is usually vomit that contains bright red blood. Coffee ground vomiting is similar to hematemesis, but is distinct in not involving bright red blood.

Hematemesis must be differentiated from hemoptysis (coughing up blood) and epistaxis (nosebleed). Both of these are more common conditions. These may be difficult to distinguish.

== Differential diagnosis ==
Hematemesis may be caused by:

- Peptic ulcer. This may be related to Zollinger–Ellison syndrome, which causes severe disease.
- Vascular malfunctions of the gastrointestinal tract, such as bleeding gastric varices or intestinal varices.
- Mallory–Weiss syndrome: bleeding tears in the esophagal mucosa, usually caused by prolonged and vigorous retching.
- Vomiting of ingested blood after bleeding in the mouth, nose, or throat.
- Tumors of the stomach or esophagus.
- Irritation or erosion of the lining of the esophagus or stomach.
- Radiation poisoning.
- Viral hemorrhagic fevers.
- Gastroenteritis.
- Gastritis.
- Chronic viral hepatitis.
- Hepatic schistosomiasis, or intestinal schistosomiasis. This is caused by the parasite Schistosoma mansoni.
- Iatrogenic injury (invasive procedure such as endoscopy or transesophageal echocardiography)
- Atrio-oesophageal fistula.
- Yellow fever.
- Strongyloidiasis.
- Certain drugs.
- Plague, most commonly from septicemic plague.
- Liver cirrhosis.
- Vascular lesions, e.g. Dieulafay's disease.

== Mechanism ==
The source of vomited blood is usually from the upper gastrointestinal tract. This can include the esophagus, stomach, and parts of the small intestine. This may be the suspensory muscle of duodenum. Hematemesis tends to occur only after significant blood loss.

== Evaluation ==
Hematemesis may be investigated with endoscopy of the upper gastrointestinal tract. Barium meal may also be used.

== Management ==
Hematemesis is treated as a medical emergency. The most vital distinction is whether there is blood loss sufficient to cause shock. Correct management is required in such conditions. It is required to perform all tests such as endoscopy before medication. A platelet test is also an important test in such conditions. Medicines such as painkillers or antibiotics, e.g. ciprofloxacin, could decrease platelet count which can lead to thrombocytopenia (when the body does not have sufficient platelets in the blood and cannot form clots). In such conditions wrong medication or management could be deadly. Blood transfusion is required in such conditions if the body loses more than 20 percent of body blood volume. Severe loss makes it impossible for the heart to pump a sufficient amount of blood to the body. In such conditions unmaintained blood volume could lead to hypovolemic shock (hypovolemic shock could lead to damage of body organs e.g. kidney, brain, or gangrene of arms or legs). An untreated patient could develop cerebral atrophy.

=== Minimal blood loss ===
In cases that do not involve shock, treatment may involve proton pump inhibitors (such as omeprazole) to treat stomach ulcers if they are present. This is given until endoscopy can be arranged. Blood transfusions may be given if the level of hemoglobin in the blood is extremely low, that is less than 8.0 g/dL or 4.5–5.0 mmol/L. A patient may be kept nothing by mouth (or no eating or drinking). Adequate venous access (such as with large-bore cannulas or a central venous catheter) is generally obtained, in case the patient develops a further bleed and becomes unstable.

=== Significant blood loss ===
In a "hemodynamically significant" case of hematemesis, there may be shock. Resuscitation is an immediate priority to prevent death. Intravenous fluids and blood transfusions can be given, preferably by large-bore intravenous cannula. The patient is prepared for emergency endoscopy, which is typically done in a operating theatre. Surgical opinion is usually sought in case the source of bleeding cannot be identified endoscopically, and laparotomy is necessary. Securing the airway is a top priority in hematemesis patients, especially those with a disturbed conscious level (hepatic encephalopathy in esophageal varices patient). This may be achieved with a cuffed endotracheal tube. Octreotide may be used if bleeding may be caused by varices.

=== Techniques ===
Hematemesis, melena, and hematochezia are symptoms of acute gastrointestinal bleeding. Bleeding that brings the patient to the physician is a potential emergency and must be considered as such until its seriousness can be evaluated. The goals in managing a major acute gastrointestinal hemorrhage are to treat hypovolemia by restoring the blood volume to normal, to make a diagnosis of the bleeding site and its underlying cause, and to treat the cause of the bleeding as definitively as possible. The history should be directed toward (1) confirming the presence of bleeding; (2) estimating its amount and rapidity; (3) identifying the source and potential specific causes; and (4) eliciting the presence of serious associated diseases that might adversely affect the outcome. The information obtained is especially helpful in identifying situations that require aggressive management.

== See also ==
- Coffee ground vomiting
- Melena
- Upper gastrointestinal bleeding
