= Bare area of the liver =

Part of the surface of the liver

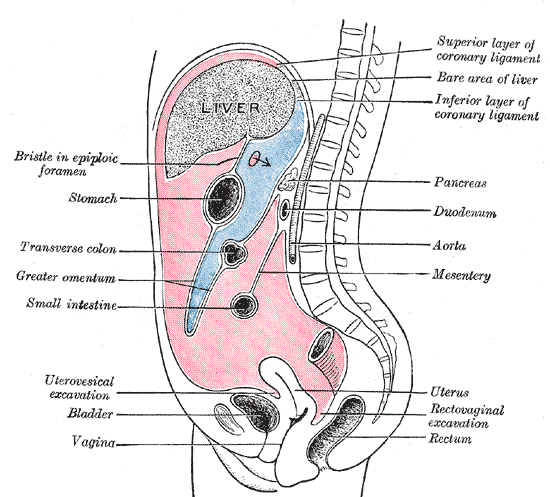
- Vertical disposition of the peritoneum. Main cavity, red; omental bursa, blue (bare area of the liver labeled at right, second from the top)

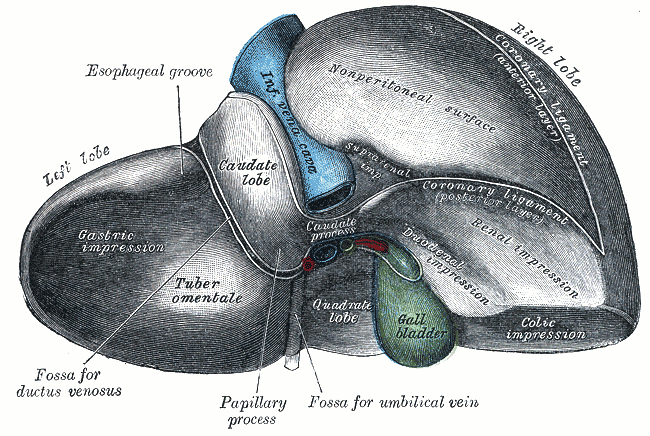
- The liver, as seen from behind. The bare area is visible on the upper-right, labeled as "nonperitoneal surface".

Details
- Part of: Liver

Identifiers
- Latin: area nuda hepatis
- FMA: 14480

The bare area of the liver (nonperitoneal area) is a large triangular area on the posterior diaphragmatic surface of the liver. It is the only part of the liver with no peritoneal covering, although it is still covered by Glisson's capsule. It is attached directly to the diaphragm by loose connective tissue. The bare area of the liver is relevant to the portacaval anastomosis, encloses the right extraperitoneal subphrenic space, and can be a site of spread of infection from the abdominal cavity to the thoracic cavity. Traumatic injury of the bare area of the liver may result in retroperitoneal hemorrhage.

== Structure ==
The bare area of the liver is found on the posterosuperior surface of the right lobe of the liver. This lies close to the thoracic diaphragm. It is the only part of the liver that has no peritoneal covering. It lies between the two layers of the coronary ligament, as well as the right triangular ligament. The coronary ligament represents reflections of the visceral peritoneum covering the liver onto the diaphragm.

The bare area of the liver is attached to the thoracic diaphragm by loose connective tissue. It touches the bottom surface of the diaphragm. It is also not covered in capsule.

== Clinical significance ==
The bare area of the liver is clinically important because of the portacaval anastomosis. It is a site where infection can spread from the abdominal cavity to the thoracic cavity. Traumatic injury involving the bare area of the liver can result in retroperitoneal hemorrhage as this region is not covered by visceral peritoneum. It encloses the right extraperitoneal subphrenic space.

== History ==
The bare area of the liver may also be known as the nonperitoneal area.

== Additional images ==
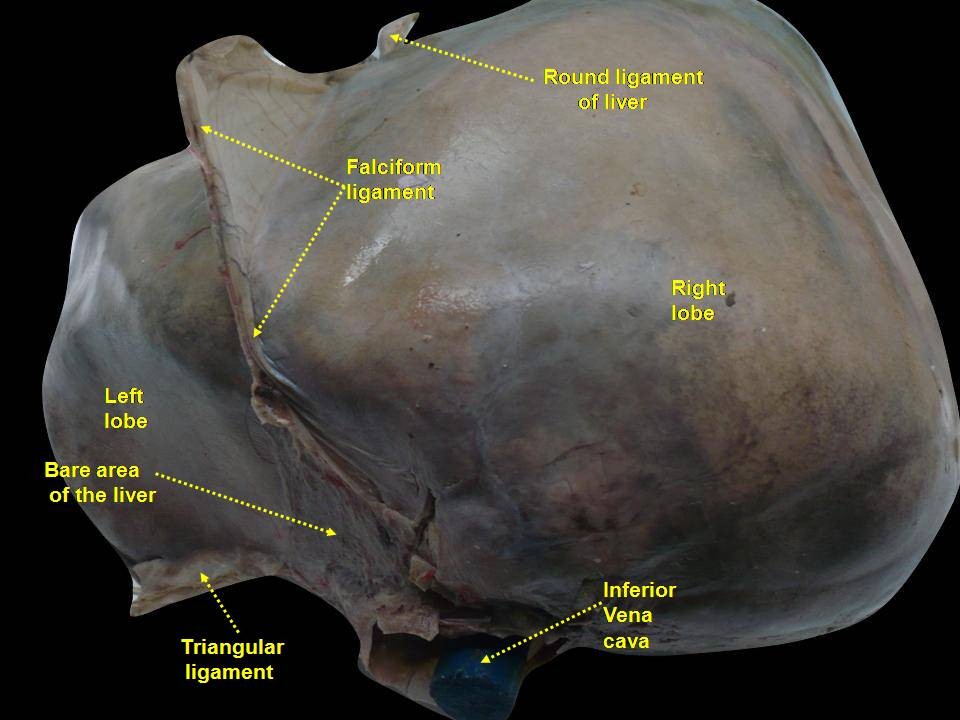
Bare area of the liver.Diaphragmatic surface of liver.
