= Josef Rösch =

American researcher and pioneer

- Born: April 27, 1925; Plzeň, Czechoslovakia
- Died: January 17, 2016 (aged 90)
- Education: MD from Charles University in 1950. Radiology residency at Central Military Hospital in Prague, Czechoslovakia.
- Occupations: Professor of Vascular and Interventional Radiology

Josef Rösch (April 27, 1925 – January 17, 2016) was a Czech-American researcher and pioneer in vascular and interventional radiology. Rösch was the first director of the Dotter Interventional Institute and served until 1995. He is credited with developing the TIPS procedure in 1969 and the incorporation of embolization into the treatment of gastrointestinal bleeding in 1971. Dr. Rösch's work in the field of interventional radiology spans half a century and has resulted in over 470 scientific papers, multiple book chapters and dozens of scientific exhibits.

== Biography ==
=== Early life and training ===
Josef Rösch was born in Plzeň, Czechoslovakia, in 1925. He credits his mother for inspiring him to help others and become a physician. Rösch attended medical school at Charles University in Prague and graduated in 1950. Initially, Rösch aspired to be an internist but decided to pursue radiology after working on splenoportography. After publishing a book on splenoportography, Rösch become friends with Charles Dotter. They would meet in 1963 at the Czechoslovak Radiologic Congress in Karlovy Vary, where Dotter gave his famous lecture on angiography, effectively creating the field of interventional radiology. Dotter recruited Rösch to do a one-year fellowship at Oregon Health and Science University. After the fellowship, Rösch spent two years at UCLA before returning to Oregon in 1970.

=== Interventional radiology career ===
While Josef Rösch helped advance many aspects of interventional radiology, his crowning achievements were the development of the TIPS procedure and the incorporation of embolization into the treatment of gastrointestinal hemorrhage. The invention of the TIPS procedure, which creates a shunt between the portal and systemic venous circulation, revolutionized the treatment for portal hypertension. Similarly, arterial embolization for gastrointestinal bleeds became a powerful tool for life-threatening hemorrhages. Other techniques Rösch worked on include super-selective catheterization, expandable stents, thrombolysis and visceral angiography.

Rösch would become the chief of vascular and interventional radiology at Oregon Health & Science University. During the late 1980s, his work helped found the Dotter Interventional Institute. Rösch retired from clinical practice in 1995 and has since served in a research faculty role at the Dotter Institute.

== Awards ==
Some of Rösch's notable awards include:

- SCVIR Gold Medal
- Japanese Society of Angiography and Interventional Radiology Gold Medal
- European Radiological Congress and Western Angiographic and Interventional Society Gold Medal
- The Interventional Radiology Lifetime Achievement Award from Cardiovascular Interventional Radiology Society of Europe
- 600 Year Anniversary Medal of Charles University in Prague
- The AHA Scientific Council Distinguished Achievement and Distinguished Scientist Awards

== Sources ==
- Greene and Linton (2005). The History of Dotter Interventonal Institute: 15 Years of Education, Research, Patient Care 1990-2005. ISBN 1890705055.
