= Coronary ligament =

Ligament of the liver

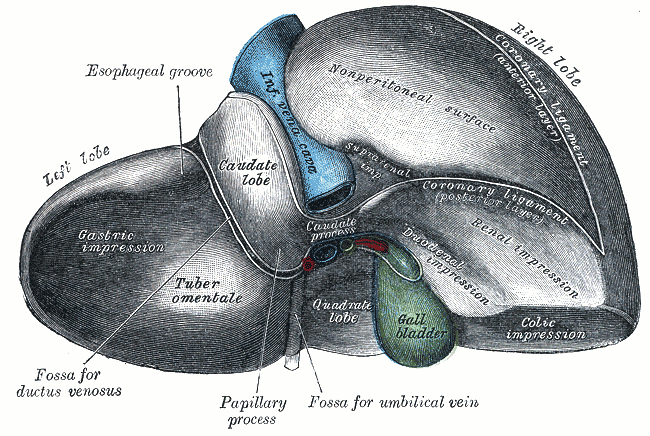
- Posterior and inferior surfaces of the liver. (Coronary ligament labeled at center right.)

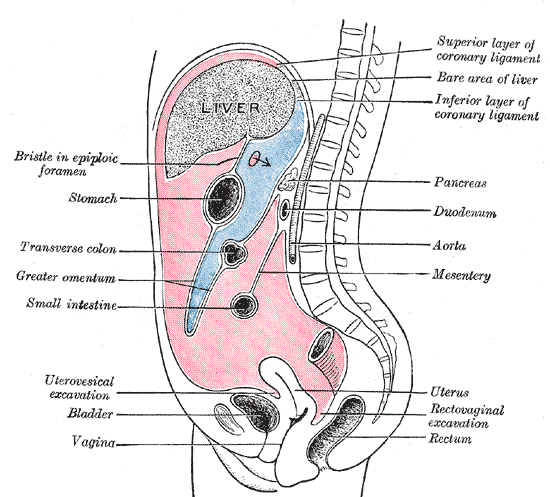
- Vertical disposition of the peritoneum. Main cavity, red; omental bursa, blue.

Details

Identifiers
- Latin: ligamentum coronarium hepatis
- TA98: A10.1.02.302
- TA2: 3772
- FMA: 15822

The coronary ligament of the liver refers to parts of the peritoneal reflections that hold the liver to the inferior surface of the diaphragm.

== Structure ==
The convex diaphragmatic surface of the liver (anterior, superior and a little posterior) is connected to the concavity of the inferior surface of the diaphragm by reflections of peritoneum. The coronary ligament is the largest of these, having an anterior (frontal) and posterior (back) layers.

The diaphragmatic surface of the liver that is in direct contact with the diaphragm (just beyond the peritoneal reflections) has no peritoneal covering, and is termed the bare area of the liver.

The anterior layer of the coronary ligament is formed by the reflection of the peritoneum from the upper margin of the bare area of the liver to the under surface of the diaphragm.

The posterior layer of the coronary ligament is reflected from the lower margin of the bare area and is continuous with the right layer of the lesser omentum.

The anterior and posterior layers converge on the right and left sides of the liver to form the right triangular ligament and the left triangular ligament, respectively. In between the two sides of the anterior layer, the reflection of peritoneum has an inferior continuation termed the falciform ligament. The falciform ligament contains the round ligament of liver.

== Additional images ==
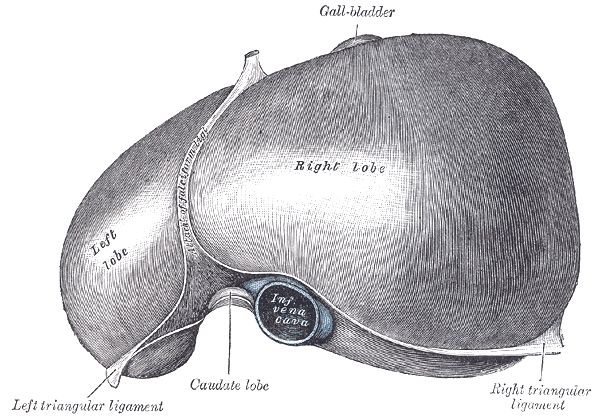
The superior surface of the liver.
