= W. Dean Warren =

American medical academic (1924–1989)

W. Dean Warren (October 28, 1924 – May 10, 1989) was Joseph B. Whitehead Professor and Chairman of the Department of Surgery at Emory University until his death in from cancer) in 1989. Prior to his chairmanship at Emory he was Chairman of Surgery at the University of Miami. Warren was a pioneer in surgery for portal hypertension and developed the distal splenorenal shunt.

He was the recipient of many honours and served as President of the American College of Surgeons. His memory is honored by an annual lectureship at Emory University.
