= Anorectal varices =

Dilated veins in the anus

- Specialty: Gastroenterology, Hematology
- Symptoms: Coffee ground vomiting, Hematochezia
- Complications: Internal bleeding, hypovolemic shock, cardiac arrest
- Causes: Portal hypertension
- Treatment: Treating portal hypertension, surgery (transjugular intrahepatic portosystemic shunt)

Anorectal varices are collateral submucosal blood vessels dilated by backflow in the veins of the rectum. Typically this occurs due to portal hypertension which shunts venous blood from the portal system through the portosystemic anastomosis present at this site into the systemic venous system. This can also occur in the esophagus, causing esophageal varices, and at the level of the umbilicus, causing caput medusae. Between 44% and 78% of patients with portal hypertension get anorectal varices.

== Pathogenesis ==
Blood from the superior portion of the rectum normally drains into the superior rectal vein and via the inferior mesenteric vein to the liver as part of the portal venous system. Blood from the middle and inferior portions of the rectum is drained via the middle and inferior rectal veins. In portal hypertension, venous resistance is increased within the portal venous system; when the pressure in the portal venous system increases above that of the systemic, blood is shunted through the portosystemic anastomoses. The shunting of blood and consequential increase of pressure through the collateral veins causes the varicosities.

== Diagnosis ==
The terms rectal varices and haemorrhoids are often used interchangeably, but this is not correct. Haemorrhoids are due to prolapse of the rectal venous plexus and are no more common in patients with portal hypertension than in those without. Rectal varices, however, are found only in patients with portal hypertension and are common in conditions such as cirrhosis.

== Treatment ==
Unlike esophageal varices, rectal varices are less prone to bleeding, are less serious when a bleed does occur, and are easier to treat because of the more accessible location. However, in some cases, rectal varices can result in severe bleeding.

Typically, treatment consists of addressing the underlying portal hypertension. Some treatments include portosystemic shunting, ligation, and under-running suturing. Insertion of a transjugular intrahepatic portosystemic shunt (TIPS) has been shown to alleviate varices caused by portal hypertension. Successful treatment of portal hypertension that subsequently reduces anorectal varices provides a confirmation of the initial diagnosis, allowing for a distinction between varices and hemorrhoids, which would not have been alleviated by reduction of portal hypertension.
