= Hypericum sect. Sampsonia =

Scientific classification
- Kingdom: Plantae
- Clade: Tracheophytes
- Clade: Angiosperms
- Clade: Eudicots
- Clade: Rosids
- Order: Malpighiales
- Family: Hypericaceae
- Genus: Hypericum
- Section: Hypericum sect. Sampsonia; N.Robson

Species
- Hypericum assamicum; Hypericum sampsonii

Section of plants

Hypericum sect. Sampsonia is a small section of plants in the genus Hypericum. It comprises only two species, both endemic to eastern Asia: Hypericum sampsonii and Hypericum assamicum.

They are perennial herbs, the stem bases sometimes becoming woody, growing up to 80 cm (31 in) tall. They have black glands on the leaves, petals, anthers, and usually the sepals. The leaves are opposite and perfoliate with entire margins. They have 5 sepals, 5 yellow petals, 3 styles, and numerous stamens.
