= Right triangular ligament =

Ligament connected to the liver

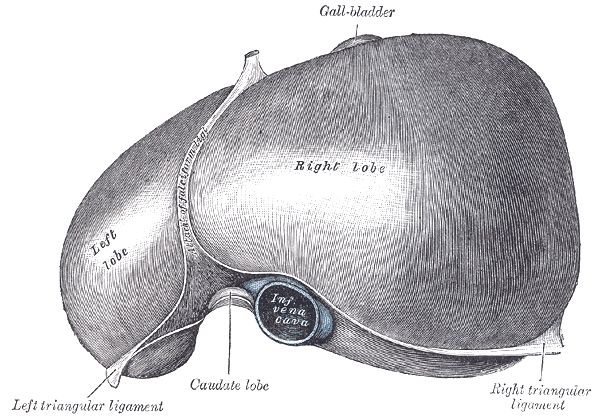
- The superior surface of the liver.

Details

Identifiers
- Latin: ligamentum triangulare dextrum hepatis
- TA98: A10.1.02.304
- TA2: 3775
- FMA: 76986

The right triangular ligament is situated at the right extremity of the bare area, and is a small fold which passes to the diaphragm, being formed by the apposition of the upper and lower layers of the coronary ligament.

== Additional images ==
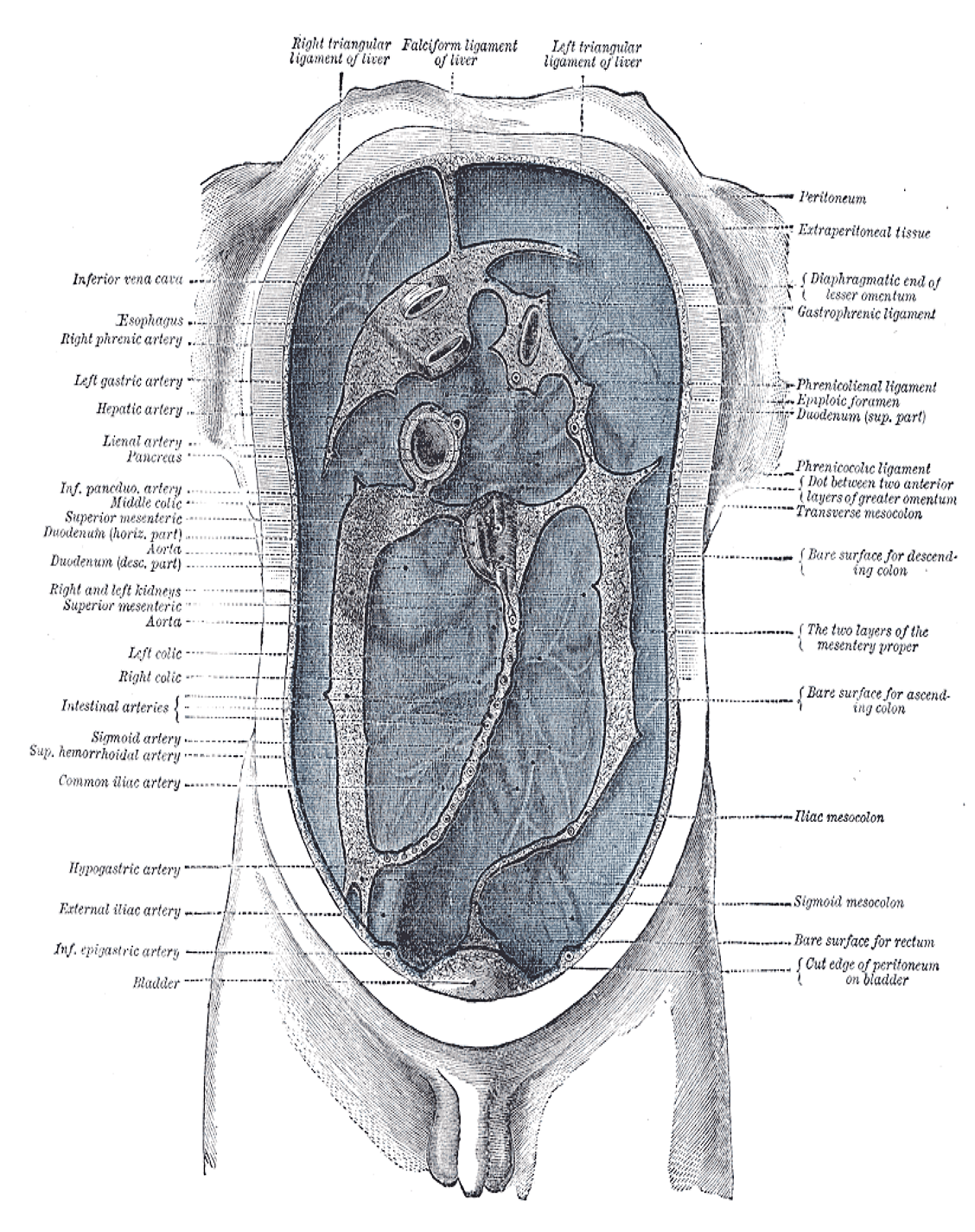
Diagram to show the lines along which the peritoneum leaves the wall of the abdomen to invest the viscera.
