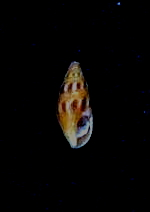
- Shell of Psittacodrillia diversa (museum specimen at Naturalis Biodiversity Center)

Scientific classification
- Kingdom: Animalia
- Phylum: Mollusca
- Class: Gastropoda
- Subclass: Caenogastropoda
- Order: Neogastropoda
- Superfamily: Conoidea
- Family: Horaiclavidae
- Genus: Psittacodrillia
- Species: P. diversa

Binomial name
- Psittacodrillia diversa (E.A. Smith, 1882)

Synonyms
- Crassispira diversa (E. A. Smith, 1882); Drillia diversa (E. A. Smith, 1882); Drillia sowerbyi (non Turton, 1932); Barnard, 1959; Pleurotoma (Clionella) diversa G.B. Sowerby III, 1892; Pleurotoma (Clavus) diversa E.A. Smith, 1882

= Psittacodrillia diversa =

Species of gastropod

Psittacodrillia diversa is a species of sea snail, a marine gastropod mollusk in the family Horaiclavidae.

== Description ==
The length of the shell attains 14 mm, its diameter 5.5 mm.

The biconic-claviform shell has about two whorls in the protoconch and five weakly convex whorls in the teleoconch. The shell shows 10 to 12 axial ribs on the early whorls and 9 to 11 on the penultimate whorl. The ribs only occupy the lower two-thirds of the whorl, the remainder being simple. The spiral striation is fine; that towards the base of the body whorl is a trifle coarser. The aperture is oblong. The siphonal canal is wide. The columella is slightly convex and has a moderately thick callus. The shell is orange-red with darker red spots in the intervals on the whorls.

== Distribution ==
This marine species occurs off Jeffrey's Bay - East Cape, South Africa
