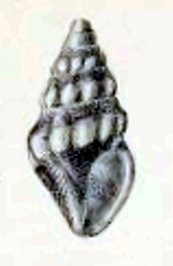
- Original image of a shell of Psittacodrillia albonodulosa

Scientific classification
- Kingdom: Animalia
- Phylum: Mollusca
- Class: Gastropoda
- Subclass: Caenogastropoda
- Order: Neogastropoda
- Superfamily: Conoidea
- Family: Horaiclavidae
- Genus: Psittacodrillia
- Species: P. albonodulosa

Binomial name
- Psittacodrillia albonodulosa (E.A. Smith, 1904)

Synonyms
- Crassispira albonodulosa (E. A. Smith, 1904); Drillia albonodulosa E.A. Smith, 1904 (basionym)

= Psittacodrillia albonodulosa =

Species of gastropod

Psittacodrillia albonodulosa is a species of sea snail, a marine gastropod mollusk in the family Horaiclavidae.

== Description ==
The length of the shell attains 8.3 mm, its diameter 4 mm.

The small, dark-red shell contains six convex whorls and, contrary to the other species in this genus, the apex is not papilliform but slightly depressed. The shell has 10 axial ribs on the whorls. The body whorl has only 6 or 7 ribs, the last part without ribs. The white marks on the ribs is continued as a white band on the smooth part, but it is superficial and not deeply seated. The shell shows spiral striae over whole whorl, 5–6 on the sulcus, 14-15 (or more) below (visible in worn specimens only between the ribs) and c. 15 stronger and more widely spaced striae on base. The aperture is oblong-ovate. The outer lip has a thin border. The columella is upright and shows a small callus. The wide siphonal canal is shallow The shell shows a vestigial varix and fasciole.

== Distribution ==
This marine species occurs off Jeffrey's Bay - Northeast Cape, South Africa
