= Wale mark =

Endoscopic sign

Endoscopic image of esophageal varices being ligated with rubber bands. The varix being ligated has a longitudinal red mark on it, termed the wale mark

A wale mark, red wale sign or wale sign is an endoscopic sign suggestive of recent hemorrhage, or propensity to bleed, seen in individuals with esophageal varices at the time of endoscopy. The mark has the appearance of a longitudinal red streak located on an esophageal varix. It derives its name from the visual similarity to patterns seen in the textile corduroy.

Similar lesions that are suggestive of recent or impending bleeding from esophageal varices include the cherry-red spot, which is circular and red in colour. Bleeding risk of esophageal varices can be ascertained at the time of endoscopy by evaluating for the presence of these markers.

== See also ==
- Esophageal varices
