= Psittacodrillia =

Scientific classification
- Kingdom: Animalia
- Phylum: Mollusca
- Class: Gastropoda
- Subclass: Caenogastropoda
- Order: Neogastropoda
- Superfamily: Conoidea
- Family: Horaiclavidae
- Genus: Psittacodrillia; R.N. Kilburn, 1988

Type species
- Pleurotoma bairstowi Sowerby III, 1886

Species
- See text

Genus of gastropods

Psittacodrillia is a genus of sea snails, marine gastropod mollusks in the family Horaiclavidae.

== Species ==
Species within the genus Psittacodrillia include:

- Psittacodrillia albonodulosa (Smith E. A., 1904)
- Psittacodrillia bairstowi (Sowerby III, 1886)
- Psittacodrillia diversa (Smith E. A., 1882)
