= Varices =

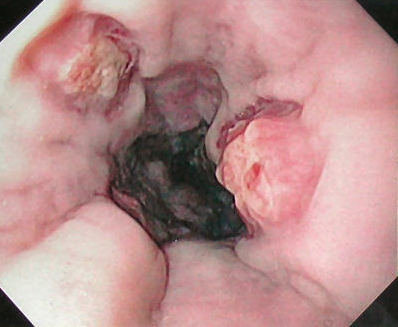
- Esophageal ulcers after banding
- Specialty: Hematology
- Symptoms: Internal bleeding
- Complications: hypovolemic shock cardiac arrest

A varix (pl.: varices) is an abnormally dilated blood vessel with a tortuous course. Varices usually occur in the venous system, but may also occur in arterial or lymphatic vessels. Varices can occur in various locations throughout the body including the legs, esophagus, stomach, among others. They are the result of increased venous pressure, typically due to increased peripheral pressure or portal hypertension.

Varicose veins are the most common type of varices. They are the enlargement of superficial veins in the legs with increased pressure due to various risk factors. Approximately 20-30% of adults in the U.S. have varicose veins and more often occurs in women and the elderly. Gastrointestinal varices are another prevalent type, including esophageal and gastric varices, and are a health concern due to risk for future hemorrhage.

== Types ==
Examples of varices include:

- Varicose veins, large tortuous veins usually found on legs
- Sublingual (under the tongue) varices
- Esophageal varices, commonly stemming from cirrhosis of the liver, also known as oesophageal varicose
- Gastric varices, commonly stemming from cirrhosis of the liver
- Intestinal varices
- Scrotal varices
- Vulvar varices
- Pelvic varices
- Vesical varices, varicose veins associated with the urinary bladder
- Rectal varices, which can be similar to external haemorrhoids

== Pathophysiology ==
The mechanism behind varices differs between the types. There are two main overarching groups. There are varices that form in the digestive tract and peripheral varices, the most common form being varicose veins.

=== Portal Hypertension Varices ===
These include

- Esophageal varices
- Gastric varices
- Rectal varices
- Duodenal varices
- Stomal varices

Varices along the digestive tract often occur due to portal hypertension. Portal hypertension occurs when the liver cannot filter blood appropriately, whether due to cirrhosis or other disease processes. The inability to filter the blood can then cause increased pressure due to decreased blood flow and results in increased resistance to portal blood flow and/or increased portal venous inflow. In cirrhosis, increased resistance is the result of both structural changes, including distortion of liver vascular architecture by fibrosis and regenerative nodules, and dynamic changes, including increased hepatic vascular tone due to endothelial dysfunction and decreased nitric oxide bioavailability. The resulting portal hypertension causes the body to find alternate routes around the liver back to the heart.

The alternate paths the blood can take includes smaller blood vessels in the esophagus, stomach, and rectum. These vessels often then stretch and swell forming varices due to the increased pressure through blood vessels not designed for that level of high-pressure flow. Varices are then formed and become at risk for rupture if the pressure continues to increase. When these blood vessels rupture, they increase the risk of hemorrhage.

=== Varicose Veins ===
The pathophysiology is different for lower extremity varicose veins. These develop due to a variety of factors including increased intravenous pressure, incompetent valves, weak vascular walls, and genetic predisposition. Most often, the pathophysiology of varicose veins is the loss of vein wall elasticity causing valvular dysfunction. The loss of elasticity due to increased pressure is further exacerbated by gravity. Hence, activities such as prolonged standing, walking, and obesity can further increase risk of this condition. Valvular dysfunction then causes blood to pools in the legs below the site of incompetence, causing the veins to stretch and bulge, and this then forms varices. This can be in the superficial or deep veins, but the typical appearance of varicose veins is due to primarily superficial vein swelling.

== Risk Factors ==
=== Portal Hypertension Varices ===
The primary risk factor for gastroesophageal varices is cirrhosis. In patients with cirrhosis, varices are present in approximately 30-40% of stable cirrhotic patients and 60% of patients with fluid buildup in their abdomen called ascites.

The following factors increase risk of gastroesophageal variceal bleeding

- Size of varices
- Severity of liver dysfunction
- Alcohol use
- Presence of infection

=== Varicose Veins ===
Varicose veins are at increased risk of formation with the following factors

- Female sex
- Prolonged standing
- Increased age
- Obesity
- Multiple pregnancies
- Family history
- Congenital valvular dysfunction

== Clinical Presentation ==
=== Portal Hypertension Varices ===
With gastroesophageal varices, they are most often undetected due to lack of symptoms until rupture and bleeding occur. Bleeding occurs when the expanding force from pressure of the increased blood and flow can no longer be contained by the blood vessel wall tension and the vessel ruptures. Variceal bleeding typically presents as hemorrhage and is a medical emergency. As such, patients with cirrhosis are recommended to have regular endoscopies as recommended by their physician to identify if there is variceal formation. Esophageal and gastric varices are the most common sources of severe bleeding.

Symptoms can include

- Hematemesis (Vomiting blood, can be bright red or dark like coffee grounds)
- Melena (Blood in stools, appears as black, tarry stools)
- Signs of hemodynamic instability such as
  - Low blood pressure
  - High heart rate
  - Dizziness

Data has shown approximately 25% of people with varices will have bleeding within 2 years of being diagnosed. Bleeding carries an approximately 20% mortality risk within 6 weeks of a bleeding episode, with the mortality risk increasing if there is an infection.

=== Varicose Veins ===
Varicose veins are typically more easily detectable. People will present with visibly dilated veins on the lower extremities.

They can also present with symptoms such as

- Leg heaviness
- Leg aching
- Itching or burning
- Symptoms worse with standing
- Skin changes can occur in advanced cases

There are also variants of varicose veins including spider veins which are smaller than varicose veins, but more superficial. As mentioned previously, approximately 20-30% of adults in the U.S. have varicose veins.

== Diagnosis ==
=== Portal Hypertension Varices ===
Endoscopic screening by upper endoscopy is recommended for all cirrhotic patients at the time of diagnosis. It allows for direct visualization of gastroesophageal varices, and if present, helps guide prophylactic treatment based on assessment of high-risk factors. Another method to preemptively check for the risk of developing varices includes measuring the hepatic venous pressure gradient using a catheter. There is a risk for varices development with a gradient value >12 mm Hg.

Ectopic variceal bleeding is bleeding in the GI system besides gastric and esophageal varices. This should be considered when people have a bleed but endoscopy shows no active bleeding in the esophagus and stomach. Additional imaging options for these patients include CT angiography or capsule endoscopy to identify alternate ectopic bleeding sources.

=== Varicose Veins ===
For lower extremity varicose veins, diagnosis is primarily clinical through physical examination. Ultrasound can be used to assess venous reflux of these vessels and rule out deep venous thrombosis or DVT, which would require emergent care.

== Treatment ==
=== Portal Hypertension Varices ===
Acute gastroesophageal variceal bleeding is a medical emergency and requires immediate attention for stabilization. This can involve treatment with fluids and, vasoactive drugs to lower pressure in the vessels, and blood transfusions as needed. For esophageal varices, endoscopic variceal ligation (EVL) is the preferred treatment. This is when small rubber bands are placed around the veins to stop the bleeding. For gastric varices, the preferred treatment is a special glue such as cyanoacrylate or other procedures like TIPS where a shunt placed in the liver to lower pressure in the vessels if bleeding is hard to control. After the bleeding is controlled, long-term prevention includes taking non-selective beta-blockers such as propranolol or nadolol to lower vein pressure and having repeat endoscopies to check and treat the blood vessels as needed.

=== Varicose Veins ===
Treatment options for varicose veins include both conservative and procedural approaches. Conservative management focuses on symptom relief and includes leg elevation, exercise, and compression therapy with stockings providing pressure. These measures are recommended for symptomatic patients. Weight management and addressing risk factors such as obesity are also important. For patients with persistent symptoms or complications, procedural interventions are indicated. Endovenous laser ablation is the first-line treatment for saphenous vein incompetence. Surgery, such as high ligation and stripping or ambulatory phlebectomy, are reserved for cases where minimally invasive techniques are contraindicated or unsuccessful.

== See also ==
- Varicose ulcer
- Varix (mollusc)
