= Coffee ground vomiting =

Vomiting of black blood

- Specialty: Gastroenterology
- Symptoms: Vomiting dark blood
- Causes: Gastritis; Gastrointestinal bleeding Stomach cancer Yellow fever

Coffee ground vomitus refers to a particular appearance of vomit. Within organic heme molecules of red blood cells is the element iron, which oxidizes following exposure to gastric acid. This reaction causes the vomitus to look black, similar to coffee grounds.

== Causes ==
Esophagitis, esophageal varices, gastritis, cirrhosis or gastric ulcers for example, may bleed and produce coffee-ground vomitus. When unaccompanied by melena, hematemesis or a fall in hemoglobin with corresponding urea rises and creates an unstable reaction, and other causes of coffee ground vomitus need to be elucidated; for example, gastric stasis, bowel obstruction or ileus, that can cause oxidised food material to be vomited. Vomiting iron supplements can also mimic coffee grounds to the untrained eye.

Diseases such as Ebola, yellow fever, viral hepatitis, haemophilia B, fatty liver disease and cancers of stomach, pancreas, esophagus and, rarely, retrograde jejunogastric intussusception might also be the reason behind coffee-ground vomitus.

When attributed to peptic inflammation, use of nonsteroidal anti-inflammatory drugs (NSAIDs) is commonly implicated. These drugs can interfere with the stomach's natural defenses against the strongly acidic environment, causing damage to the mucosa that can result in bleeding. Therefore, it is recommended that these class of drugs be taken with food or on a full stomach. Other causes of inflammation may be due to severe gastroesophageal reflux disease, Helicobacter pylori gastritis, portal hypertensive gastropathy or malignancy.

When bright red blood is vomited, it is termed hematemesis. Hematemesis, in contrast to coffee ground vomitus, suggests that upper gastrointestinal bleeding is more acute or more severe, for example due to a Mallory–Weiss tear, gastric ulcer or Dieulafoy's lesion, or esophageal varices. This condition may be a medical emergency and urgent care may be required.

Oxidized blood from an upper gastrointestinal bleed can also be excreted in stool. It produces blackened, "tarry" stools known as melena.

== Evaluation ==
Upper endoscopy can be used to locate bleeding in the upper gastrointestinal system. In this method a camera is inserted through the mouth to visualize the esophagus, stomach, and duodenum.

Numerous studies have suggested that urgent endoscopy is not required for coffee ground emesis alone. Other factors, such as hemodynamic stability, hemoglobin concentration, and various elements of the patient's history may guide clinicians to obtain or defer urgent endoscopy. Additionally, nasogastric aspirates can be used to predict the likelihood that endoscopy will reveal high-risk bleeding.

While endoscopic visualization may be sufficient for diagnosis, a biopsy may also be taken during endoscopy, aiding in the diagnosis of H. pylori infections, and differentiating tumors.

CT angiography may also be used to locate the source of upper-GI bleeding.

== Management ==
Treatment of coffee ground emesis depends on underlying etiology. Patient history and initial labs, especially hemoglobin, can help stratify patients by need for immediate intervention.

Bleeding ulcers believed to be caused by H. pylori infections are typically treated with a combination of medications. Medications used in the treatment of such ulcers fall into two categories. First, medications are used to decrease pain associated with ulcers by limiting acid exposure to sensitive ulcers. This can be accomplished by medications that reduce stomach acid production, such as proton pump inhibitors (PPI) or H2-blockers, or through conventional antacids. Sucralfate is also effective in this role, as it coats the ulcer, thus protecting it from caustic stomach acid. Second, antibiotic therapy is used to eliminate the underlying bacterial infection. Clarithromycin and amoxicillin are commonly used in tandem, but antibiotic regiments may vary based on organism susceptibility, side effects, and patient allergies. Gastric ulcers caused by NSAID use can be treated with NSAID cessation, or a proton pump inhibitor if cessation is not possible. Non-healing ulcers should be examined for other causes, such as cancer or Zollinger-Elison syndrome.

Esophageal bleeding is predominantly caused by gastrointestinal reflux disease (GERD). PPI medications are preferred to H2-blocking medication due to increased rates of patient improvement, though both medications are commonly used. Severe cases of GERD may be refractory to these medications and require fundoplication, a surgery in which the gastroesophageal junction is surgically reinforced. While lifestyle modifications, diet modification, and antacid use may reduce GERD symptoms such as heartburn, these methods are not sufficient to heal esophageal ulcers.

Variceal bleeding may be treated through a variety of medications and interventions, depending on underlying causes and severity. Severe cases are unlikely to present as coffee ground emesis, and are more likely to present as bright red vomitus.

Esophageal lacerations (Mallory-Weiss tears) are mostly self-limiting, though the majority require blood transfusions to compensate for blood loss. Endoscopic interventions, including epinephrine injections, clipping, and cauterization may be utilized if needed.
