= Distal splenorenal shunt procedure =

Medical procedure

- 3D rendered CT of abdominal aortic branches and kidneys, to show relative position of veins. Splenic vein and left renal vein labeled at center right.
- Other names: Splenorenal shunt procedure
- ICD-9-CM: 39.1
- MeSH: D013164

In medicine, a distal splenorenal shunt procedure (DSRS), also splenorenal shunt procedure and Warren shunt, is a surgical procedure in which the distal splenic vein (a part of the portal venous system) is attached to the left renal vein (a part of the systemic venous system). It is used to treat portal hypertension and its main complication (esophageal varices). It was developed by W. Dean Warren.

== Splenopancreatic and gastric disconnection (SPGD) ==
DSRS is typically done with splenopancreatic and gastric disconnection (ligation of the gastric veins and pancreatic veins (that drain into the portal vein) and complete detachment of the splenic vein from the portal venous system), as it improves the outcome.

== Comparison to TIPS ==
Survival with a transjugular intrahepatic portosystemic shunt (TIPS) versus a DSRS is thought to be approximately similar, but still an area of intensive research.

Both TIPS and DSRS lead to decreased rates of variceal bleeding at the expense of hepatic encephalopathy; however, TIPS appears to have more shunt dysfunction and lead to more encephalopathy and bleeds. DSRS appears to be more cost effective than TIPS.
