= Intestinal varices =

- Specialty: Gastroenterology Hematology
- Symptoms: Coffee ground vomiting Hematochezia
- Complications: Internal bleeding, hypovolemic shock, cardiac arrest

Intestinal varices are dilated submucosal veins in the intestine.One treatment includes a transjugular intrahepatic portosystemic shunt.
