= Gastric vein =

Gastric vein may refer to:

- Left gastric vein
- Right gastric vein
- Short gastric veins
