= Hepatic veins =

One of two sets of veins connected to the liver

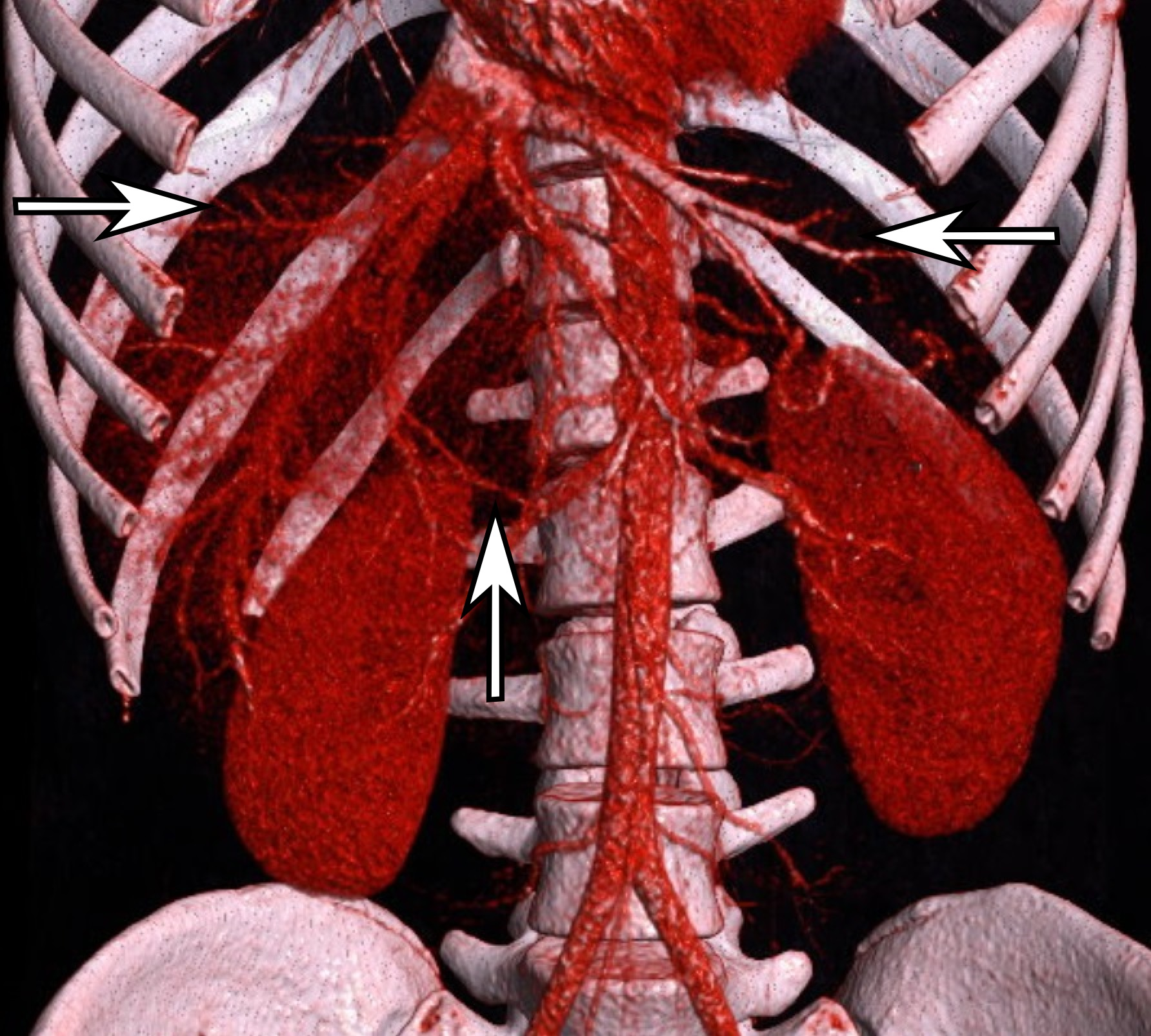
- Volume rendering of an abdominal CT, with hepatic veins annotated by arrows. The aorta and branches is seen in center.

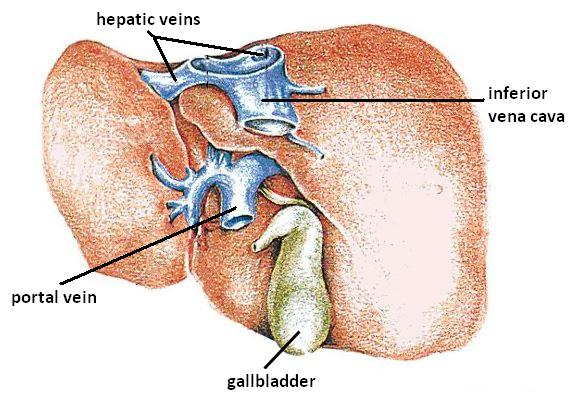
- The hepatic veins are the veins of the liver, two of which are shown in this diagram.

Details
- Precursor: Vitelline veins
- Drains from: Liver
- Source: Hepatic portal vein
- Drains to: Inferior vena cava
- Artery: Hepatic artery

Identifiers
- Latin: venae hepaticae
- MeSH: D006503
- TA98: A12.3.09.005
- TA2: 4994
- FMA: 14337

In human anatomy, the hepatic veins are the veins that drain venous blood from the liver into the inferior vena cava (as opposed to the hepatic portal vein which conveys blood from the gastrointestinal organs to the liver). There are usually three large upper hepatic veins draining from the left, middle, and right parts of the liver, as well as a number (6-20) of lower hepatic veins. All hepatic veins are valveless.

== Structure ==
All the hepatic veins drain into the inferior vena cava. The hepatic veins are divided into an upper and a lower group.

=== Upper group ===
The upper group consists of three hepatic veins - the right, middle, and left hepatic veins - draining the central veins from the right, middle, and left regions of the liver and are larger than the lower group of veins. The veins of the upper group drain into the suprahepatic part of the inferior vena cava (i.e. part superior to the liver).

==== Right hepatic vein ====
The right hepatic vein is the longest and largest of all the hepatic veins. It drains the liver segments VI and VII in their entirety, and variably participates in the drainage of segments V and VIII; the extent of drainage of the latter two segments by the right hepatic veins as opposed to the middle hepatic vein and possible variant accessory veins determines the calibre of the right hepatic vein. It arises anteriorly near the inferior border of the liver, coursing along the right portal fissure to drain into the inferior vena cava near the superior margin of the caudate lobe. It usually reaches the inferior vena cava as a single vessel, but sometimes drains into it as two separate trunks.

==== Middle hepatic vein ====
The middle hepatic vein drains the central portion of the liver, draining segments IV, V, and VIII. The middle hepatic vein most often joins the left hepatic vein to form a short common trunk to drain jointly into the inferior vena cava; the middle hepatic vein drains into the inferior vena cava as a separate vessel in less than 10% of individuals.

==== Left hepatic vein ====
The left hepatic vein usually drains liver segments II and III, and occasionally also segment IV. The umbilical fissure vein is a major tributary of the left hepatic vein. The left hepatic vein most often forms a short common trunk with the middle hepatic vein before these jointly drain into the inferior vena cava.

=== Lower group ===
The lower group consists of 6-20 smaller hepatic veins which drain the right lobe and the caudate lobe, are in contact with the hepatic tissue, and are valveless. All veins of the lower group drain into the retrohepatic part of the inferior vena cava (i.e. part posterior to the liver).

The lower group consists of 1-5 veins draining the liver segment I, and may consist of (inconsistently present) accessory inferior hepatic vein, accessory middle right hepatic vein, and several smaller retrohepatic veins draining the right lobe of the liver.

== Clinical significance ==
The hepatic veins (and their variant anatomy) are relevant in liver resection and transplantation, and in Budd–Chiari syndrome.

Budd–Chiari syndrome is a condition caused by blockage of the hepatic veins, such as by a blood clot. It presents with a "classical triad" of abdominal pain, ascites, and liver enlargement. It occurs in 1 out of a million individuals. The syndrome can be fulminant, acute, chronic, or asymptomatic. The independent lower veins draining the liver segment I directly into the inferior vena cava are unaffected by obstruction of the large hepatic veins, leading to compensatory hypertrophy.

The hepatic veins may be connected with the portal veins in a TIPS procedure.

== Additional images ==
Animated volume rendered CT scan of abdominal and pelvic blood vessels.

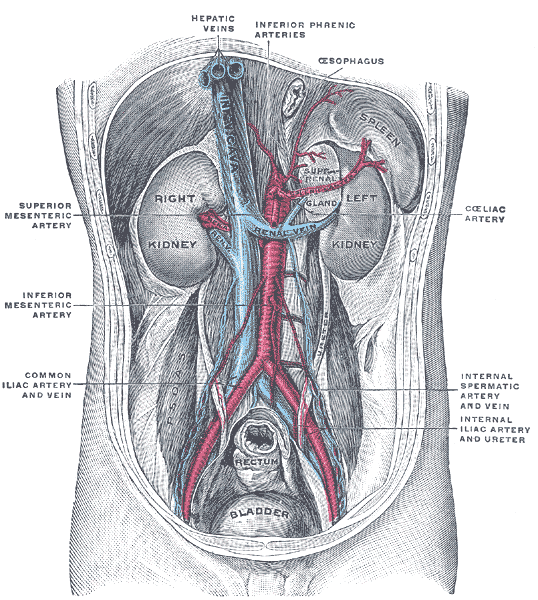
Posterior abdominal wall, after removal of the peritoneum, showing kidneys, suprarenal capsules, and great vessels. (Hepatic veins labeled at center top.)

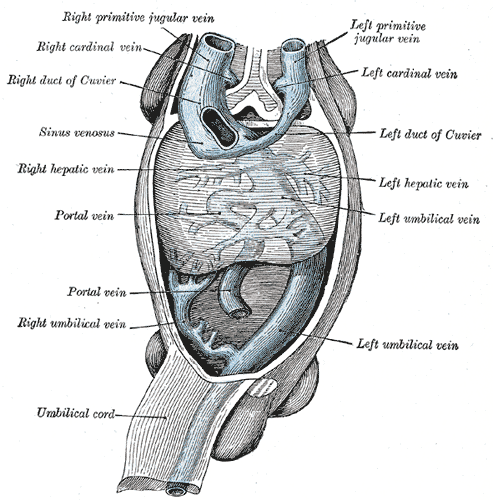
Human embryo with heart and anterior body-wall removed to show the sinus venosus and its tributaries.

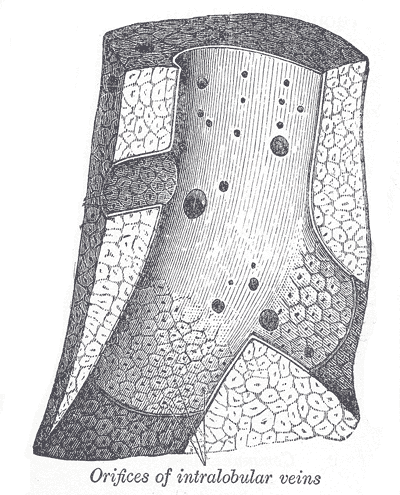
Longitudinal section of a hepatic vein.

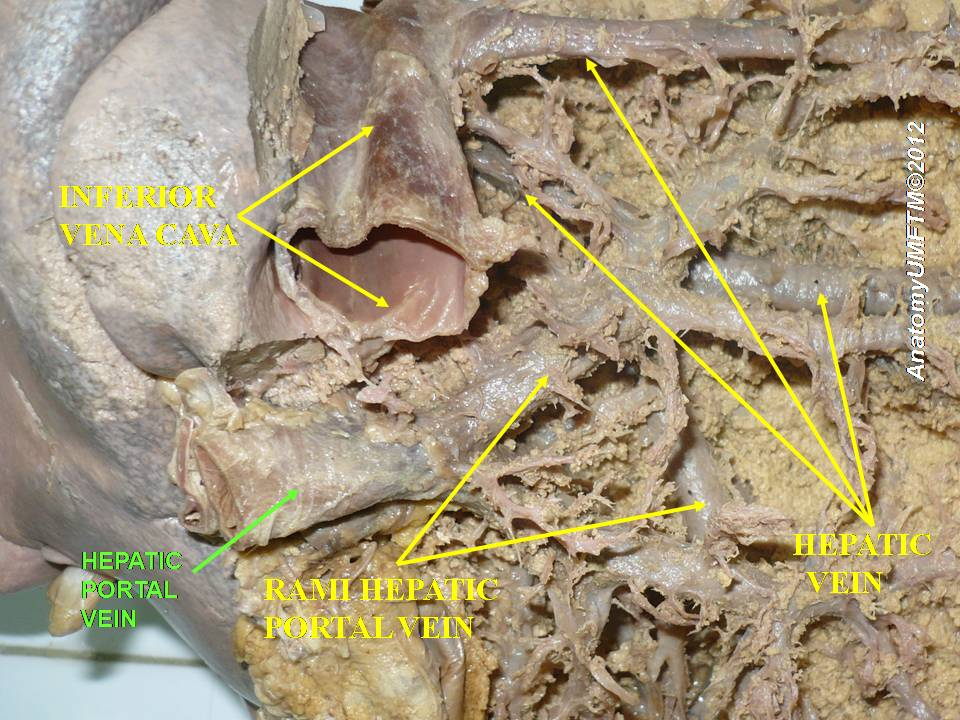
Hepatic vein

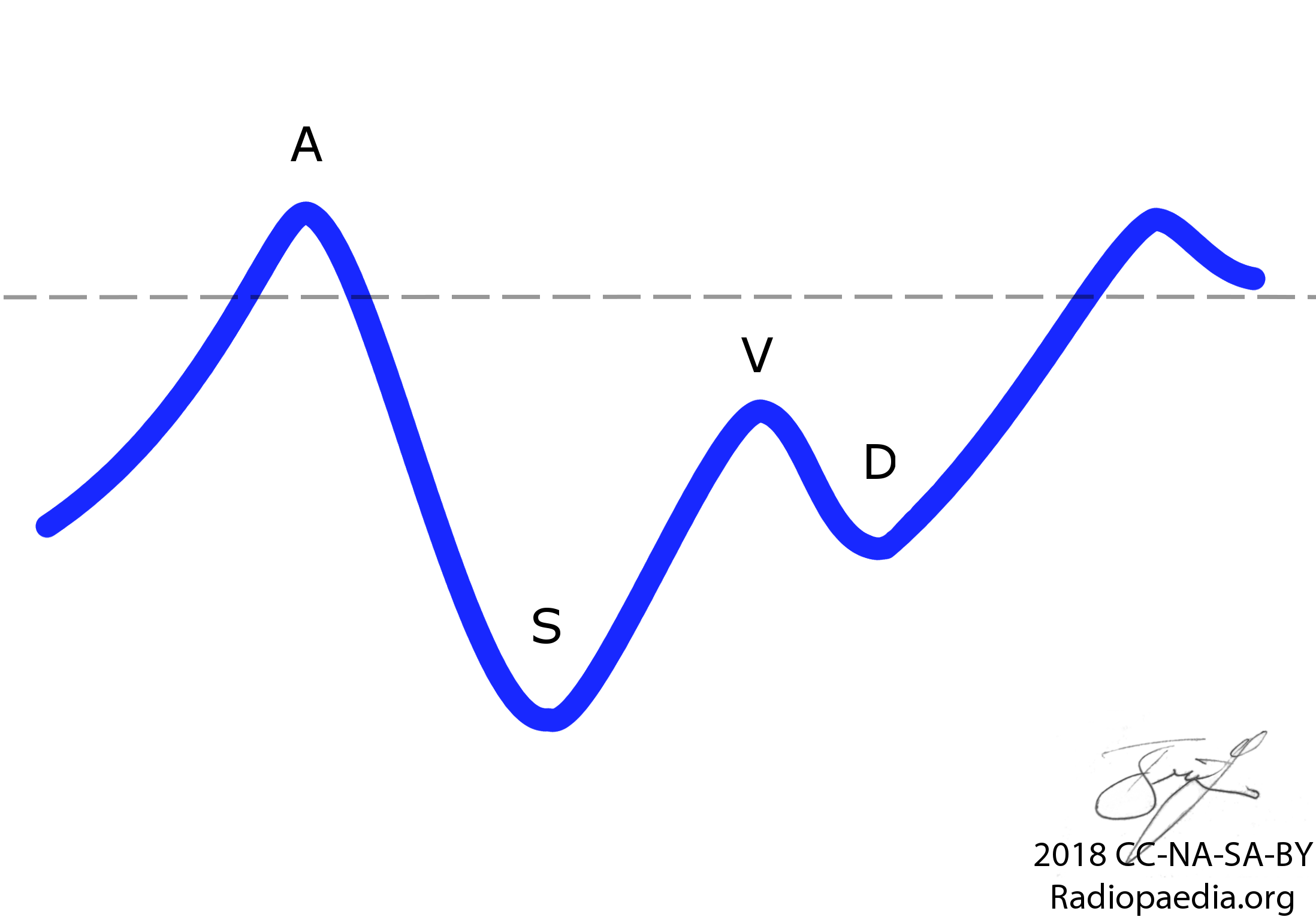
Normal spectral Doppler waveform of hepatic venous flow

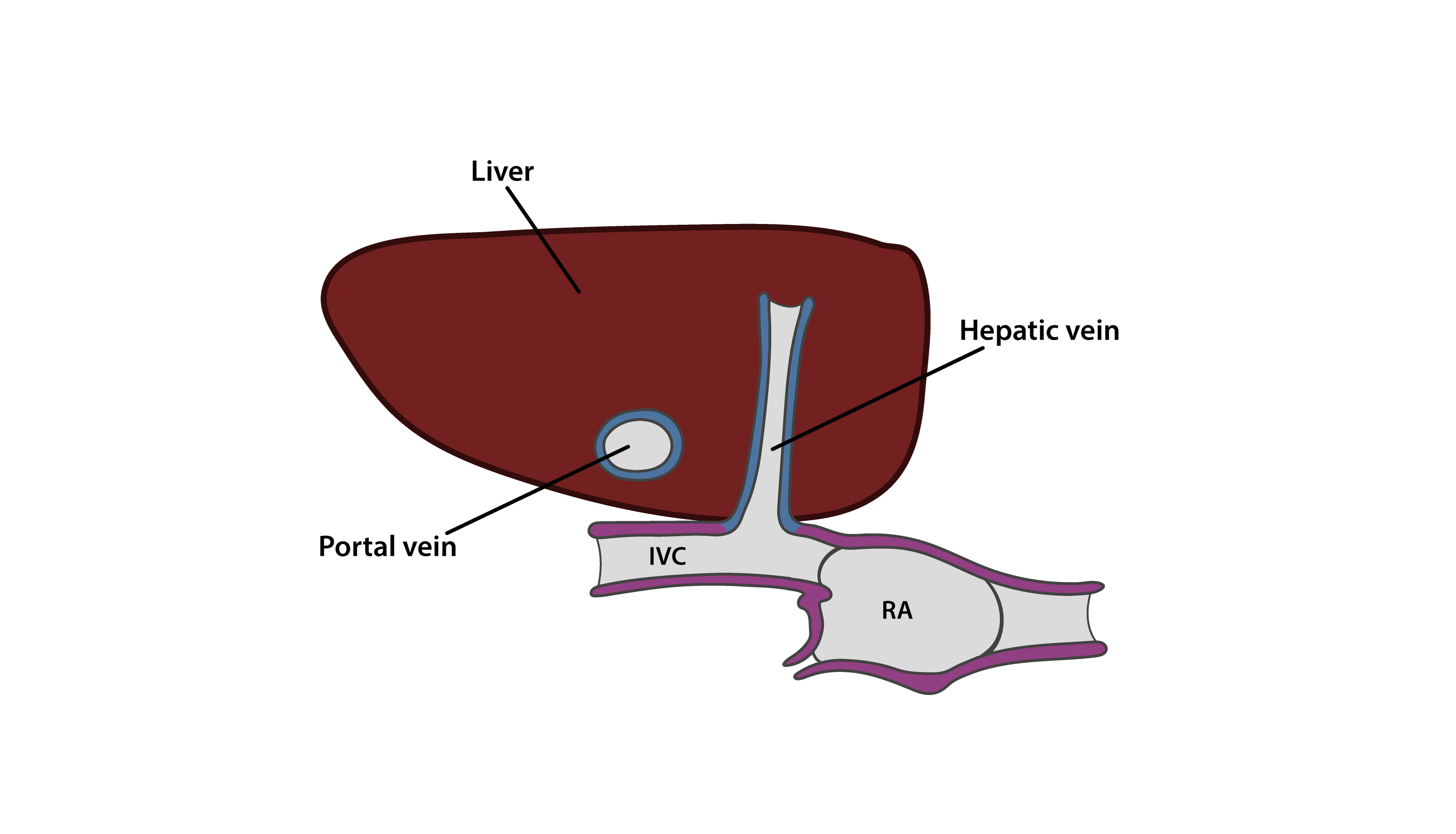
Subcostal view of hepatic vein and surrounding organs by point of care ultrasound (POCUS)
