= Gastric varices =

Dilated submucosal veins in the stomach lining

- Isolated gastric varices of Sarin classification IGV-1 seen on gastroscopy in a patient with portal hypertension
- Specialty: Gastroenterology Hematology
- Symptoms: vomiting blood passing black stool
- Complications: Internal bleeding, hypovolemic shock, cardiac arrest

Gastric varices are dilated submucosal veins in the lining of the stomach, which can be a life-threatening cause of bleeding in the upper gastrointestinal tract. They are most commonly found in patients with portal hypertension, or elevated pressure in the portal vein system, which may be a complication of cirrhosis. Gastric varices may also be found in patients with thrombosis of the splenic vein, into which the short gastric veins that drain the fundus of the stomach flow. The latter may be a complication of acute pancreatitis, pancreatic cancer, or other abdominal tumours, as well as hepatitis C. Gastric varices and associated bleeding are a potential complication of schistosomiasis resulting from portal hypertension.

Patients with bleeding gastric varices can present with bloody vomiting (hematemesis), dark, tarry stools (melena), or rectal bleeding. The bleeding may be brisk, and patients may soon develop shock. Treatment of gastric varices can include injection of the varices with cyanoacrylate glue, or a radiological procedure to decrease the pressure in the portal vein, termed transjugular intrahepatic portosystemic shunt or TIPS. Treatment with intravenous octreotide is also useful to shunt blood flow away from the stomach's circulation. More aggressive treatment, including splenectomy (surgical removal of the spleen) or liver transplantation, may be required in some cases.

== Signs and symptoms ==
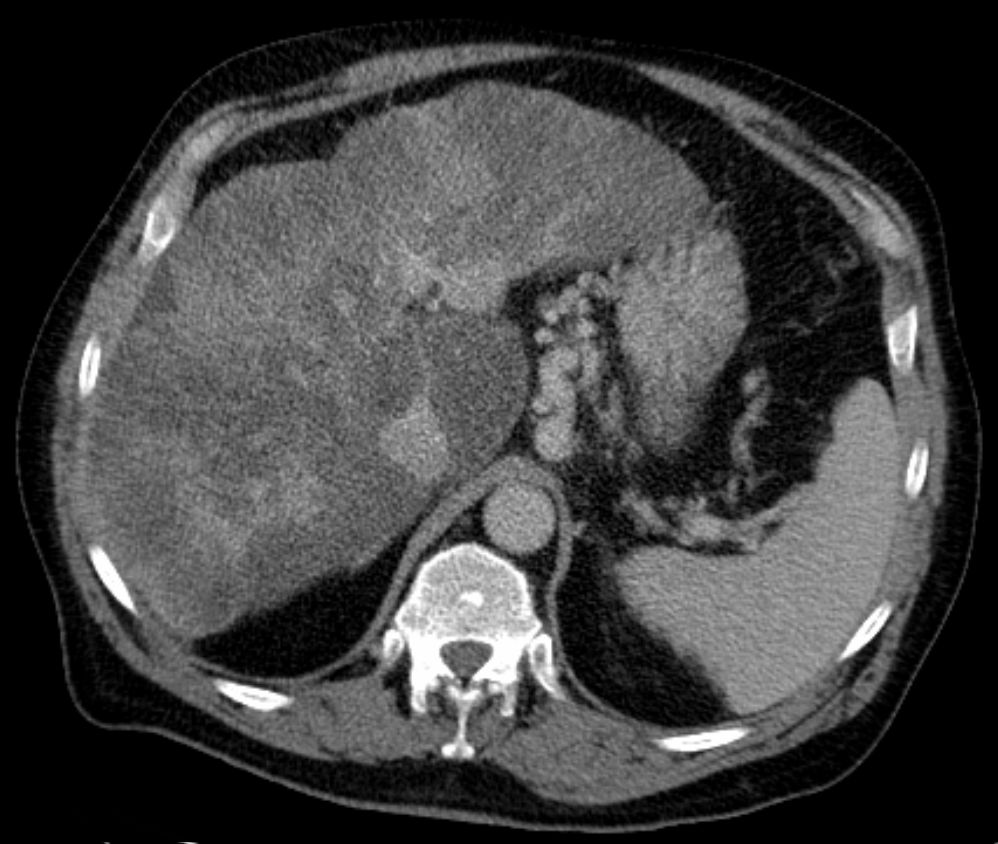
Axial CT showing varices of the fundus in liver cirrhosis with portal hypertension

Gastric varices can present in two major ways. First, patients with cirrhosis may be enrolled in screening gastroscopy programs to detect esophageal varices. These evaluations may detect gastric varices that are asymptomatic. When gastric varices are symptomatic, however, they usually present acutely and dramatically with upper gastrointestinal bleeding. The symptoms can include vomiting blood, melena (passing black, tarry stools); or passing maroon stools or frank blood in the stools. Many people with bleeding gastric varices present in shock due to the profound loss of blood.

Secondly, patients with acute pancreatitis may present with gastric varices as a complication of a blood clot in the splenic vein. The splenic vein sits over the pancreas anatomically. Inflammation or cancers of the pancreas may result in a blood clot forming in the splenic vein. As the short gastric veins of the fundus of the stomach drain into the splenic vein, thrombosis of the splenic vein will result in increased pressure and engorgement of the short veins, leading to varices in the fundus of the stomach.

Laboratory testing usually shows low red blood cell count and often a low platelet count. If cirrhosis is present, there may be coagulopathy manifested by a prolonged INR; both of these may worsen the bleeding from gastric varices.

In rare cases, gastric varices are caused by splenic vein occlusion as a result of the mass effect of slow-growing pancreatic neuroendocrine tumors.

== Diagnosis ==
The diagnosis of gastric varices is often made at the time of upper endoscopy.

The Sarin classification of gastric varices identifies two types of gastroesophageal varices, where esophageal varices are found concurrently, and two types of isolated gastric varices, found in the absence of esophageal varices.

=== Classification ===
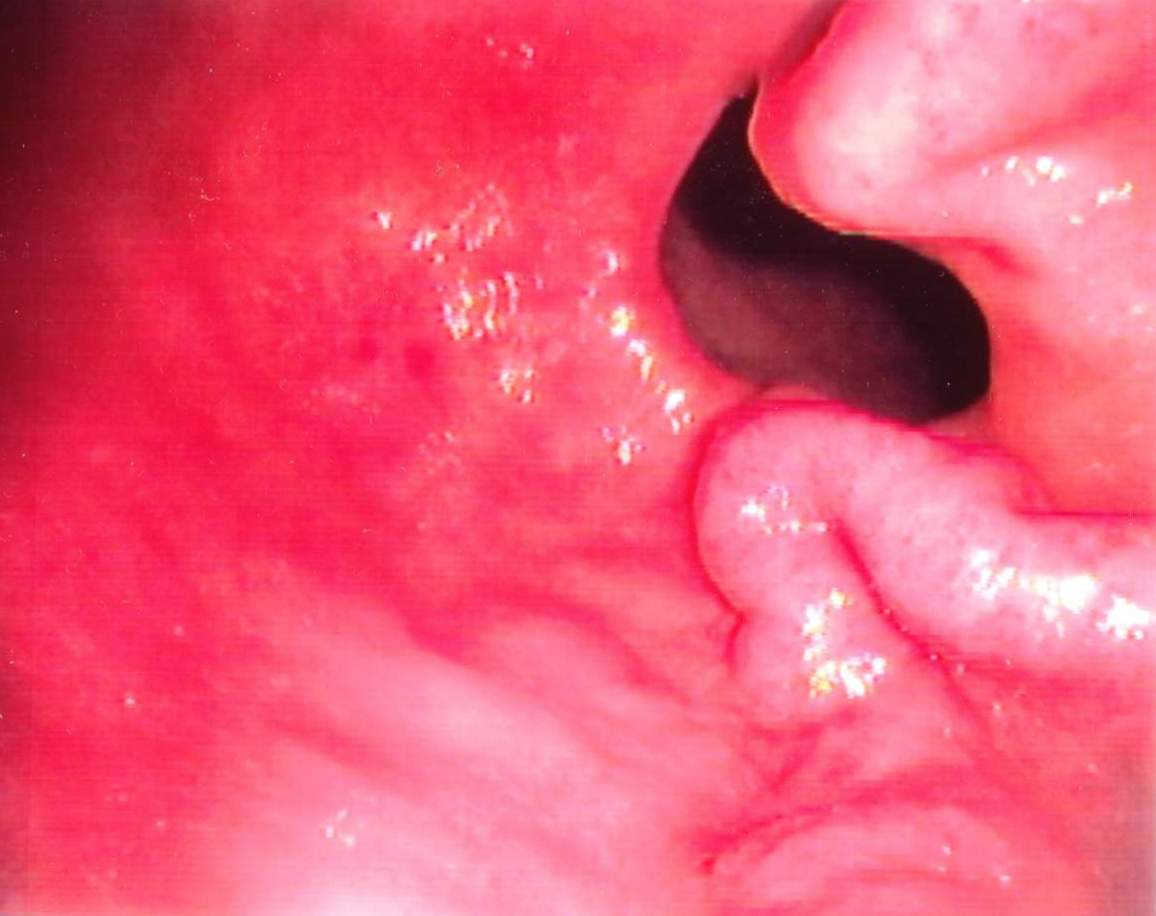
Antral varices, of Sarin classification IGV-2, an unusual class of gastric varices.

The Sarin classification of gastric varices identifies four different anatomical types of gastric varices, which differ in terms of treatment modalities:

- Type 1 Gastroesophageal Varices: Esophagus extending to lesser curvature of stomach
- Type 2 Gastroesophageal Varices: Esophagus extending to greater curvature of stomach
- Type 1 Gastric Varices: Isolated to the fundus
- Type 2 Gastric Varices: Anywhere in the stomach, or duodenum

Type 1 isolated gastric varices were seen only in primary cases (i.e. without prior sclerotherapy) in the original study of Sarin et al. (1992), while type 1 gastroesophageal varices were the most common overall.

Other classification systems include Hashizume's classification and Arakawa's classification.

== Treatment ==
Initial treatment of bleeding from gastric varices focuses on resuscitation, much as with esophageal varices. This includes administration of fluids, blood products, and antibiotics.

Another treatment for gastric varices is injection of the varices with cyanoacrylate, first described by German surgeon Nib Soehendra and colleagues in 1986. The results from two randomized trials comparing band ligation vs cyanoacrylate suggests that endoscopic injection of cyanoacrylate, known as gastric variceal obliteration or GVO is superior to band ligation in preventing rebleeding rates. Cyanoacrylate, a common component in 'super glue' is often mixed 1:1 with lipiodol to prevent polymerization in the endoscopy delivery optics, and to show on radiographic imaging. GVO is usually performed in specialized therapeutic endoscopy centers. Complications include sepsis, embolization of glue, and obstruction from polymerization in the lumen of the stomach.

Other techniques for refractory bleeding include:

- Transjugular intrahepatic portosystemic shunts (TIPS)
- Balloon occluded retrograde transvenous obliteration techniques (BRTO)
- Coil-assisted retrograde transvenous obliteration (CARTO)
- Gastric variceal ligation, although this modality is falling out of favour
- Intra-gastric balloon tamponade as a bridge to further therapy
  - a caveat is that a larger balloon is required to occupy the fundus of the stomach where gastric varices commonly occur
- Liver transplantation

== See also ==
- Gastric antral vascular ectasia
