= Transjugular intrahepatic portosystemic shunt =

Artificial channel within the liver

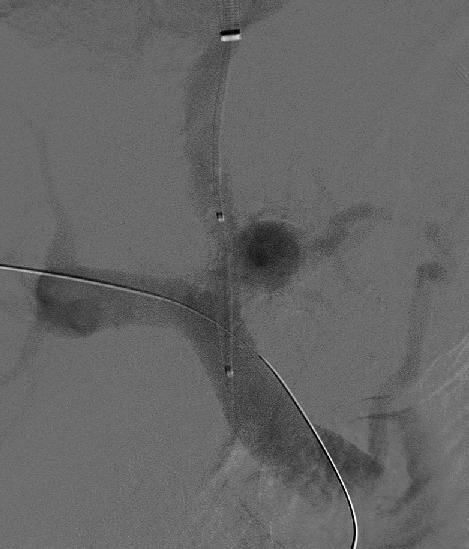
- Fluoroscopic image of TIPS in progress. A catheter has been passed into the hepatic vein and after needle puncture, a guidewire was passed into a portal vein branch. The tract was dilated with a balloon, and contrast injected. A self-expandable metallic stent has yet to be placed over the wire.
- Other names: Transjugular intrahepatic portosystemic stent shunting
- Specialty: Interventional radiology
- ICD-9-CM: 39.1
- MeSH: D019168

Transjugular intrahepatic portosystemic shunt (TIPS or TIPSS) is an artificial channel within the liver that establishes communication between the inflow portal vein and the outflow hepatic vein. It is used to treat portal hypertension (which is often due to liver cirrhosis) which frequently leads to intestinal bleeding, life-threatening esophageal bleeding (esophageal varices) and the buildup of fluid within the abdomen (ascites).

An interventional radiologist creates the shunt using an image-guided endovascular (via the blood vessels) approach, with the jugular vein as the usual entry site.

== History ==
The procedure was first described by Josef Rösch in 1969 while working as a research fellow with Charles Dotter, the "Father of Interventional Radiology," at Oregon Health and Science University. Dr. Rösch became a visiting professor at the University of California, Los Angeles, where he made an accidental entry into the peripheral portal venous branch while attempting a diagnostic transjugular cholangiogram on a canine model that became the first TIPS. They began researching how to maintain the shunts by experimenting with Teflon tubes and silicone-covered spring coils; the primary challenge was to find a material that could remain open (patent) and not clot(thrombose).

It was first used in a human patient by Dr. Ronald Colapinto of the University of Toronto in 1982, who created the first human balloon dilated TIPS, but did not become reproducibly successful until the development of self-expanding bare endovascular stents in 1985. In 1988 the first successful TIPS was realized by M. Rössle, G.M. Richter, G. Nöldge and J. Palmaz at the University of Freiburg.

The American Association for the Study of Liver Disease established practice guidelines for "role of TIPS in the management of portal hypertension" in 2005 and added Budd-Chiari syndrome as an additional indication in 2009. The procedure has since become widely accepted as the preferred method for treating portal hypertension that is refractory to medical therapy, replacing the surgical portacaval shunt in that role.

== Indications and Contraindications ==
TIPS is a life-saving procedure in bleeding from esophageal or gastric varices. A randomized study showed that the survival is better if the procedure is done within 72 hours after bleeding.

=== Indications ===
TIPS is indicated for patients with severe liver disease causing ascites that keeps recurring and does not respond to other treatment (refractory ascites), recurrent buildup of fluid around the lungs (refractory hepatic hydrothorax), hepatorenal syndrome, hepatopulmonary syndrome, Budd-Chiari syndrome, and is a secondary form of prevention for life-threatening bleeding from dilated veins in the esophagus or stomach (esophageal varices or gastric varices).

=== Contraindications ===
Absolute contraindications for TIPS include congestive heart failure, pulmonary hypertension, severe infection (sepsis), presence of blockage of the bile duct system (biliary obstruction), and presence of extensive hepatic cysts.

TIPS should not be used as primary prevention of variceal hemorrhage, for example, when a patient is actively bleeding from esophageal or gastric varices. Patients should be hemodynamically stabilized before performing a TIPS procedure.

Other relative contraindications for TIPS include presence of liver cancer, portal vein or hepatic vein thrombosis or other occlusion, severe bleeding disorders or low platelet count (coagulopathy), and advanced hepatic encephalopathy. TIPS may worsen hepatic encephalopathy.

There is some debate on whether TIPS can be done concurrently with mechanical thrombectomy (removal of a blood clot) for patients with active portal venous thrombosis. It is suggested that simultaneous treatment can restore portal vein flow with good patency (>84%) 1 year after the procedure.

== Complications ==
Severe procedural complications during a TIPS procedure, including catastrophic bleeding or direct liver injury, are relatively uncommon. In the hands of an experienced physician, operative mortality is less than 1%. On the other hand, up to 25% of patients who undergo TIPS will experience transient post-operative hepatic encephalopathy caused by increased porto-systemic passage of nitrogen from the gut.

A less common, but more serious complication, is hepatic ischemia causing acute liver failure. While healthy livers are predominantly oxygenated by portal blood supply, long-standing portal hypertension results in compensatory hypertrophy of and increased reliance on the hepatic artery for oxygenation. Thus, in people with advanced liver disease the shunting of portal blood away from hepatocytes is usually well tolerated. However, in some cases suddenly shunting portal blood flow away from the liver may result in acute liver failure secondary to hepatic ischemia. Acute hepatic dysfunction after TIPS may require emergent closure of the shunt.

A rare but serious complication is persistent TIPS infection, also known as endotipsitis.

Lastly, the TIPS may become blocked by a blood clot or in-growth of endothelial cells and no longer function. This has been significantly reduced with the use of polytetrafluoroethylene (PTFE)–covered stents.

== Mechanism of action ==
Portal hypertension, an important consequence of liver disease, results in the development of significant collateral circulation between the portal system and systemic venous drainage (porto-caval circulation). Portal venous congestion causes venous blood leaving the stomach and intestines to be diverted along auxiliary routes of lesser resistance in order to drain to systemic circulation. With time, the small vessels that comprise a collateral path for porto-caval circulation become engorged and dilated. These vessels are fragile and often hemorrhage into the GI tract. (See esophageal, gastric, rectal varices).

A TIPS procedure decreases the effective vascular resistance of the liver through the creation of an alternative pathway for portal venous circulation. By creating a shunt from the portal vein to the hepatic vein, this intervention allows portal blood an alternative avenue for draining into systemic circulation. In bypassing the flow-resistant liver, the net result is a reduced pressure drop across the liver and a decreased portal venous pressure. Decreased portal venous pressure in turn lessens congestive pressures along veins in the intestine so that future bleeding is less likely to occur. The reduced pressure also makes less fluid develop, although this benefit may take weeks or months to occur.

== Implantation ==
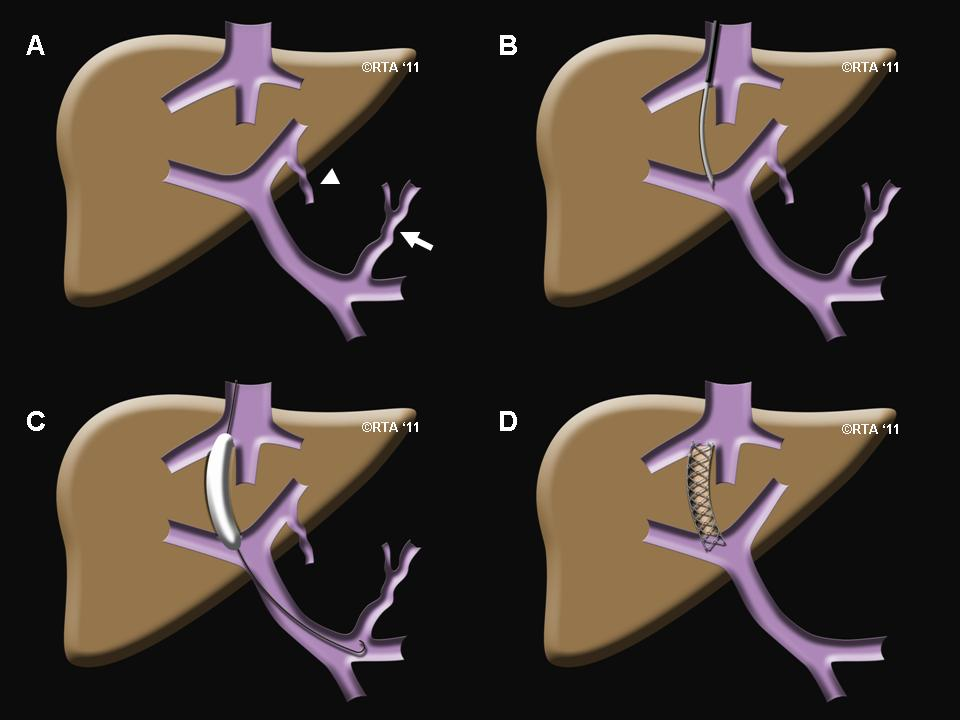
Steps in a TIPS procedure: A) portal hypertension has caused the coronary vein (arrow) and the umbilical vein (arrowhead) to dilate and flow in reverse. This leads to varices in the esophagus and stomach, which can bleed; B) a needle has been introduced (via the jugular vein) and is passing from the hepatic vein into the portal vein; c) the tract is dilated with a balloon; D) after placement of a stent, portal pressure is normalized and the coronary and umbilical veins no longer fill.

Transjugular intrahepatic portosystemic shunts are typically placed by an interventional radiologist under fluoroscopic guidance. Access to the liver is gained, as the name 'transjugular' suggests, via the internal jugular vein in the neck. Once access to the jugular vein is confirmed, a guidewire and introducer sheath are typically placed to facilitate the shunt's placement. This enables the interventional radiologist to gain access to the patient's hepatic vein by traveling from the superior vena cava into the inferior vena cava and finally the hepatic vein.

Once the catheter is in the hepatic vein, a wedge pressure is obtained to calculate the pressure gradient in the liver. Following this, carbon dioxide is injected to locate the portal vein. Then, a special needle known as a Colapinto or Rösch-Uchida is advanced through the liver parenchyma to connect the hepatic vein to the large portal vein, near the center of the liver. The channel for the shunt is next created by inflating an angioplasty balloon within the liver along the tract created by the needle. The shunt is completed by placing a special mesh tube known as a stent or endograft to maintain the tract between the higher-pressure portal vein and the lower-pressure hepatic vein. After the procedure, fluoroscopic images are made to show placement. Pressure in the portal vein and inferior vena cava are often measured as the dynamic changes in the portal pressure system can help predict mortality after TIPS.

=== TIPS with Intracardiac Echocardiography ===
TIPS can also be done with intracardiac echocardiography (ICE) guidance to assist in cases where there is challenging anatomy or presence of portal vein thrombosis. Benefits to using ICE include reduced procedure time, reduced anesthesia time, reduced radiation exposure from fluoroscopy, reduced contrast agent use, and reduced risk of puncture outside of the liver. This can also assist in cases where there may be relative contraindications to the procedure such as presence of hepatic cysts.

In the variation of the TIPS procedure with ICE, a second puncture site in the right jugular vein or the right common femoral vein is used to insert the ICE catheter. The ICE is advanced to the level of the inferior vena cava and right atrial junction and into the intrahepatic IVC to visualize the hepatic vein and the target portal venous branch. The probe is then rotated to identify the TIPS needle and help the primary operator aim for the portal venous branch.

=== Stents in TIPS ===
In order to keep the new pathway open between the portal vein and hepatic vein, stents are used in TIPS. Covered stents are preferred as they may help improve overall survival compared to bare stents. A smaller 8mm stent is preferred over a larger 10mm covered stent due to reduced risk of bleeding, higher efficacy, and lower hepatic encephalopathy rates. If an 8mm stent clots, you can repeat TIPS and replace it with a larger stent.

== See also ==
- Balloon-occluded retrograde transvenous obliteration
- Distal splenorenal shunt procedure
- Gastric antral vascular ectasia
- Portal venous system
