= Esophageal varices =

Dilated veins in the lower oesophagus

- Other names: Esophageal varix, oesophageal varices
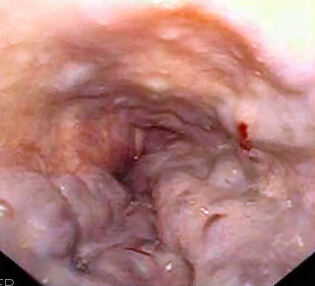
- Gastroscopy image of esophageal varices with prominent cherry-red spots and wale signs, 2006
- Specialty: Gastroenterology, Hematology, Hepatology (liver disease)
- Symptoms: vomiting blood, passing black stool
- Complications: Internal bleeding, hypovolemic shock, cardiac arrest
- Causes: portal hypertension (high blood pressure in the portal vein and the associated blood vessels in the hepatic, or liver-based, circulation)
- Diagnostic method: Endoscopy

Esophageal varices are extremely dilated sub-mucosal veins in the lower third of the esophagus. They are most often a consequence of portal hypertension, commonly due to cirrhosis. People with esophageal varices have a strong tendency to develop severe bleeding which when left untreated can be fatal. Esophageal varices are typically diagnosed through an esophagogastroduodenoscopy.

== Pathogenesis ==
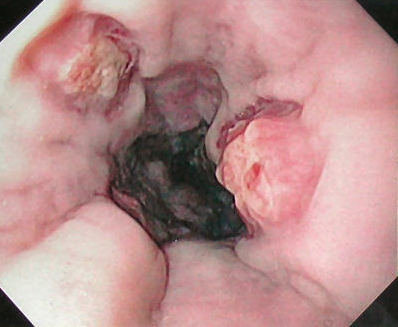
Esophageal varices seven days after banding, showing ulceration at the site of banding

The upper two thirds of the esophagus are drained via the esophageal veins, which carry deoxygenated blood from the esophagus to the azygos vein, which in turn drains directly into the superior vena cava. These veins have no part in the development of esophageal varices. The lower one third of the esophagus is drained into the superficial veins lining the esophageal mucosa, which drain into the left gastric vein, which in turn drains directly into the portal vein. These superficial veins (normally only approximately 1 mm in diameter) become distended up to 1–2 cm in diameter in association with portal hypertension.

Normal portal pressure is approximately 9 mmHg compared to an inferior vena cava pressure of 2–6 mmHg. This creates a normal pressure gradient of 3–7 mmHg. If the portal pressure rises above 12 mmHg, this gradient rises to 7–10 mmHg. A gradient greater than 5 mmHg is considered portal hypertension. At gradients greater than 10 mmHg, blood flowing through the hepatic portal system is redirected from the liver into areas with lower venous pressures. This means that collateral circulation develops in the lower esophagus, abdominal wall, stomach, and rectum. The small blood vessels in these areas become distended, becoming more thin-walled, and appear as varicosities.

In situations where portal pressures increase, such as with cirrhosis, there is dilation of veins in the anastomosis, leading to esophageal varices. Splenic vein thrombosis is a rare condition that causes esophageal varices without a raised portal pressure. Splenectomy can cure the variceal bleeding due to splenic vein thrombosis.

Varices can also form in other areas of the body, including the stomach (gastric varices), duodenum (duodenal varices), and rectum (rectal varices). Treatment of these types of varices may differ. In some cases, schistosomiasis also leads to esophageal varices.

== Histology ==
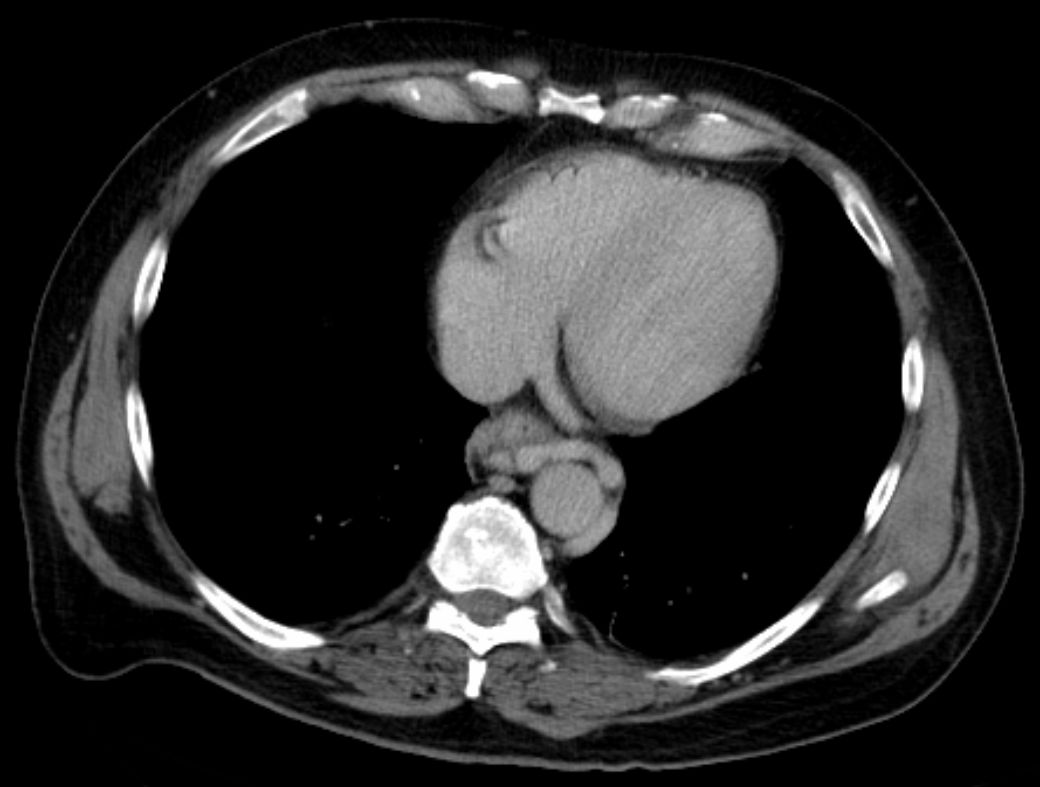
Axial CT showing esophageal varices in liver cirrhosis with portal hypertension

Dilated submucosal veins are the most prominent histologic feature of esophageal varices. The expansion of the submucosa leads to elevation of the mucosa above the surrounding tissue, which is apparent during endoscopy and is a key diagnostic feature. Evidence of recent variceal hemorrhage includes necrosis and ulceration of the mucosa. Evidence of past variceal hemorrhage includes inflammation and venous thrombosis.

== Prevention ==
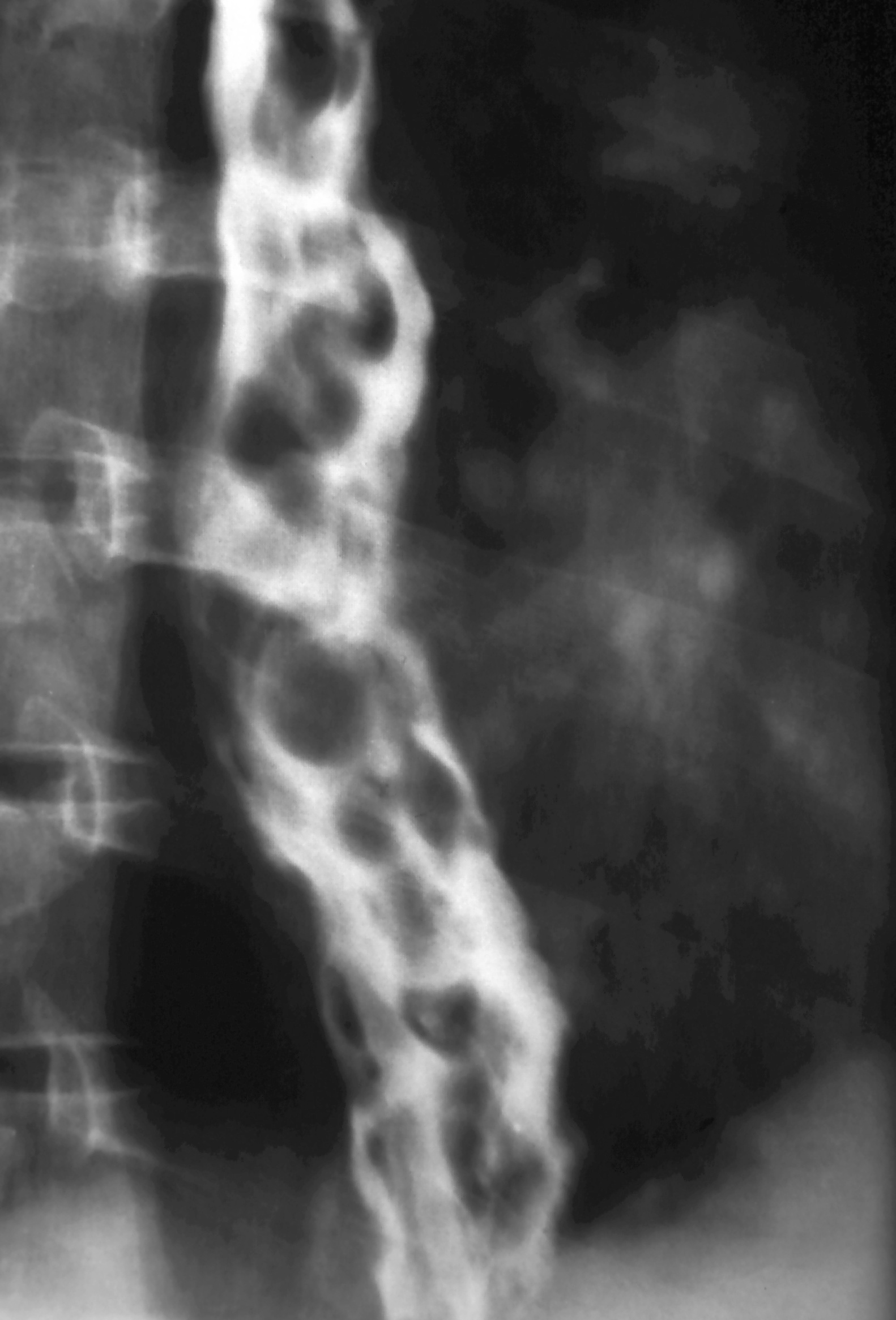
X-ray of a person with dilated, snake-like esophageal varices secondary to pulmonary hypertension

In some circumstances, people with known varices should receive treatment to reduce their risk of bleeding. The non-selective β-blockers (e.g., propranolol, timolol or nadolol) and nitrates (e.g., isosorbide mononitrate (IMN) have been evaluated for secondary prophylaxis. Non-selective β-blockers (but not cardioselective β-blockers like atenolol) are preferred because they decrease both cardiac output by β_{1} blockade and splanchnic blood flow by blocking vasodilating β_{2} receptors at splanchnic vasculature. The effectiveness of this treatment has been shown by a number of different studies.

However, non-selective β-blockers do not prevent the formation of esophageal varices.

When medical contraindications to beta-blockers exist, such as significant reactive airway disease, then treatment with prophylactic endoscopic variceal ligation is often performed.

== Treatment ==
Esophageal varices may lead to severe upper gastrointestinal bleeding. In emergency situations, care is directed at stopping blood loss, maintaining plasma volume, correcting disorders in coagulation induced by cirrhosis, and appropriate use of antibiotics such as quinolones or ceftriaxone. Blood volume resuscitation should be done promptly and with caution. The goal should be hemodynamic stability and hemoglobin of over 8 g/dl. Resuscitation of all lost blood leads to increase in portal pressure leading to more bleeding. Volume resuscitation can also worsen ascites and increase portal pressure. (AASLD guidelines)

Therapeutic endoscopy is considered the mainstay of urgent treatment. The two main therapeutic approaches are variceal ligation (banding) and sclerotherapy.

In cases of refractory bleeding, balloon tamponade with a Sengstaken–Blakemore tube may be necessary, or the use of a fully-covered esophageal self-expandable metallic stent, usually as a bridge to further endoscopy or treatment of the underlying cause of bleeding (i.e.: portal hypertension). Esophageal devascularization operations such as the Sugiura procedure can also be used to stop complicated bleeding. Methods of treating the portal hypertension include: transjugular intrahepatic portosystemic shunt (TIPS), distal splenorenal shunt procedure, or liver transplantation.

Nutritional supplementation is necessary if the person has been unable to eat for more than four days.

Terlipressin and octreotide for one to five days have also been used.

== See also ==
- Caput medusae
- Esophagitis
- Gastric varices
- Mallory–Weiss syndrome
- Portal hypertensive gastropathy
