= Presepsin =

Biomarker for the diagnosis of infections

Presepsin (soluble CD14 subtype, sCD14-ST) is a 13-kDa-cleavage product of CD14 receptor.

== Function ==
Presepsin is a soluble PRR. Presepsin in the circulation is an indicator of monocyte-macrophage activation in response to pathogens.

== Clinical relevance ==
Several clinical studies have demonstrated that presepsin is a specific and sensitive marker for the diagnosis, severity assessment and outcome prediction of sepsis. In addition, presepsin can be used for diagnosing infections in patients with a chronic inflammatory condition, such as liver cirrhosis.
