= Abnormal urine color =

- Specialty: Urology

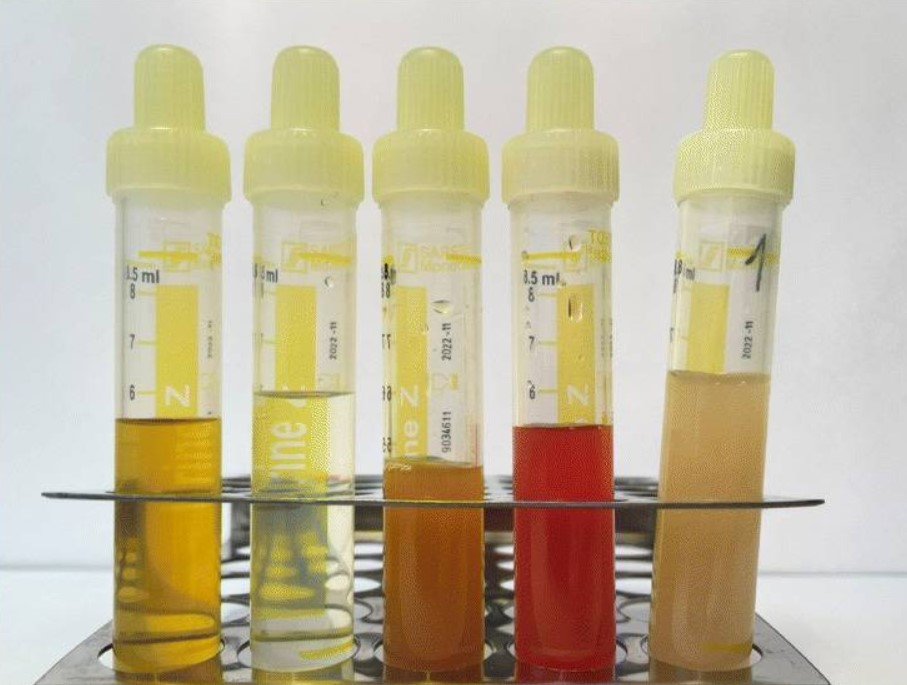
Urine samples of varying color and clarity from a study on body fluids. The two samples on the left are considered normal.

Normally, human urine color is straw-yellow. Urine color other than straw-yellow sometimes reflects an abnormality—an underlying pathological condition—in human beings.

== Signs and symptoms ==
The signs and symptoms of abnormal urine color are shown as follows:

- Unexplained urine color other than straw-yellow has continued for a long time.
- Once observe blood in urine.
- Clear, dark-brown urine.

Risk factors of clinical abnormal urine color include elderly age, strenuous exercise, and family history of related diagnosis.

== Cause ==
Infection, disease, medicines, or food can all affect urine color temporarily. For instance, cloudy or milky urine usually accompanied by bad smell possibly indicates urinary tract infection, excessive discharge of crystals, fat, white blood cells, red blood cells, or mucus.

Dark urine that looks brown but clear might be a warning sign of a serious liver disease like hepatitis or cirrhosis. In which, an excess of bilirubin being discharged through urine.

In case the urine looks in pink, red, or lighter brown is generally caused by beets, blackberries, certain food colorings, hemolytic anemia, renal impairment, urinary tract infection, medication, porphyria, intra-abdominal bleeding, vaginal bleeding, neoplasm located in either bladder or kidneys pathways.

If urine looks dark yellow or similar to orange color, the causative factors might be recent uses of a riboflavin-containing dietary supplement, carotene, phenazopyridine, rifampin, warfarin or laxative.

The causation or contributing factors of the urine color changing to green or blue are those artificial colors seen in foods and drugs, the presence of bilirubin, medicines such as methylene blue, and urinary tract infections.

== Diagnosis ==
Doctor may prescribe some tests to help get the full picture of the situation, such as blood tests, liver function tests, ultrasound for kidneys and bladder, urinalysis, urine culture for infection, and cystoscopy.

Doctor may also ask for the medical history to collect information before making a diagnosis.

== See also ==
- Urine § color
