= Spider angioma =

- Other names: Nevus araneus, spider nevus, vascular spider, spider telangiectasia
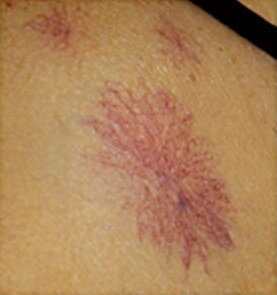
- Non-benign angiomas indicating cirrhosis
- Specialty: Dermatology

A spider angioma or spider naevus (plural: spider naevi), also nevus araneus, is a type of telangiectasis (swollen, spider-like blood vessels on the skin) found slightly beneath the skin's surface, often containing a central red spot and deep reddish extensions (see Blood color) which radiate outwards like a spider's web or a spider's legs. They are common and often benign, presenting in around 10–15% of healthy adults and young children. However, having more than three spider angiomas is likely to be abnormal and may be a sign of liver disease and/or hepatitis C (HCV virus); it also suggests the probability of esophageal varices.

== Signs and symptoms ==
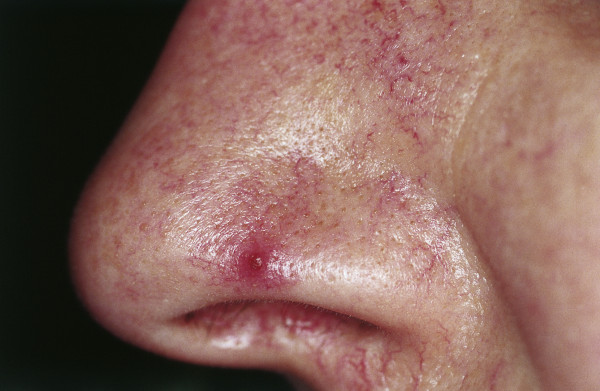
Nevus araneus (spider nevus): in the center of the red lesion a small (1 mm) red papule is visible, surrounded by several distinct radiating vessels. Pressure on the lesion causes it to disappear, however blanching is replaced by rapid refill from the central arteriole when pressure is released.

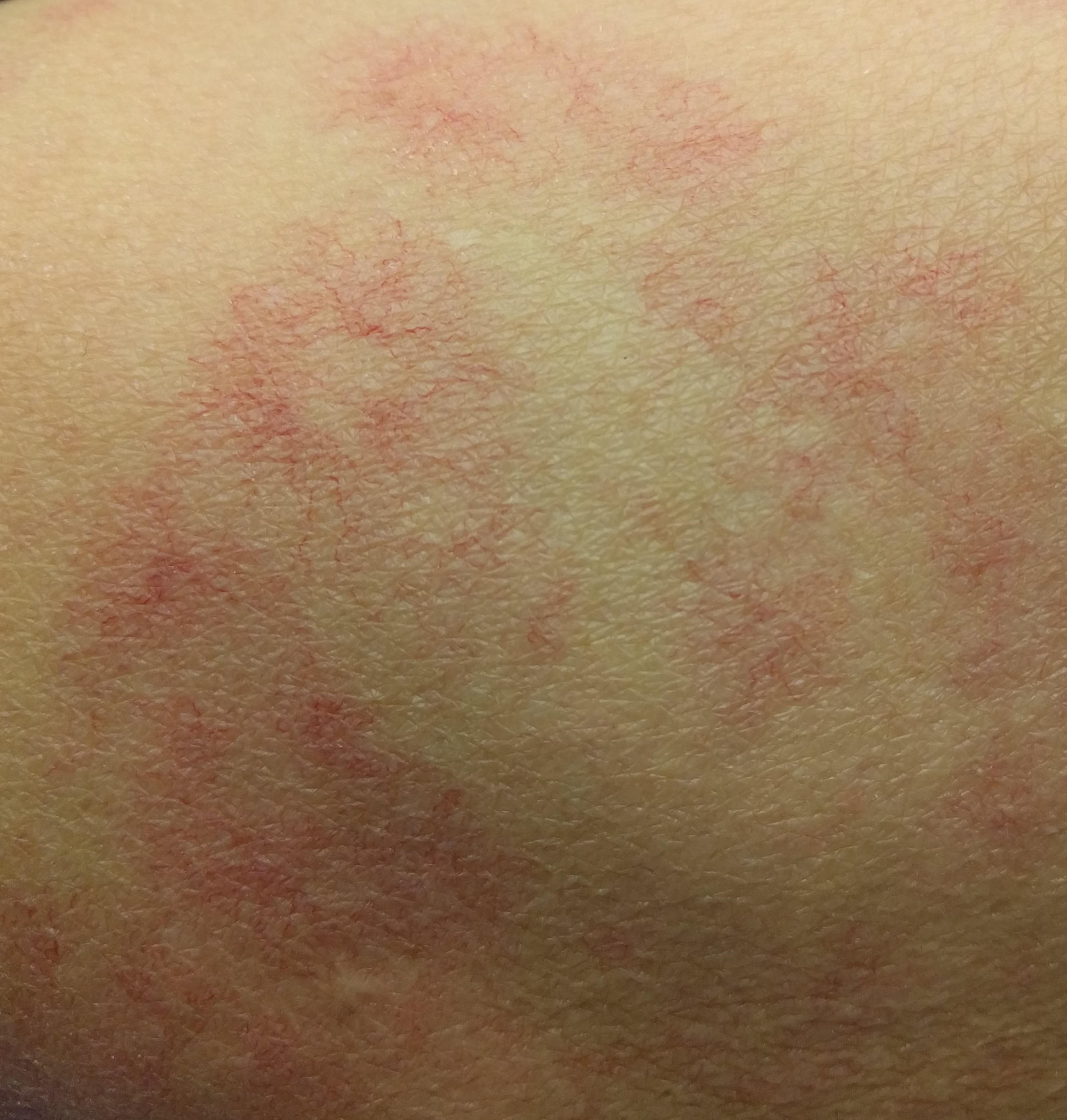
Multiple spider angiomas

Spider angiomas are found only in the distribution of the superior vena cava, and are thus commonly found on the face, neck, upper part of the torso, and arms.

== Cause ==
Spider angiomas form due to failure of the sphincteric muscle surrounding a cutaneous arteriole. The central red dot is the dilated arteriole and the red "spider legs" are small capillaries carrying away the freely flowing blood. If momentary pressure is applied, it is possible to see the emptied capillaries refilling from the center. No other angiomas show this phenomenon.

The dilation, in turn, is caused by increased estrogen levels in the blood. Many pregnant women and women using hormonal contraception have spider angiomas, which is due to high estrogen levels in their blood. Individuals with significant liver disease also show many spider angiomas, as their liver cannot metabolize circulating estrogens, specifically estrone, which derives from the androgen androstenedione. About 33% of patients with cirrhosis have spider angiomas.

Spider angiomas (spider-like blood vessels on the skin) are one of the main symptoms caused by a HCV infection. Discovering an infected patient with hepatitis C early on in the infection phase increases the chances of the virus being successfully treated and cured by oral medication.

== Diagnosis ==
Diagnosis is by clinical examination. Spider naevi are most commonly seen by general practitioners, or dermatologists. Whilst a lesion can be identified as a spider naevus, this is not a diagnosis in itself. The clinical picture should be indicative of whether there is underlying disease that should be investigated.

== Treatment ==
Spider angiomas are asymptomatic and usually resolve spontaneously. This is common in the case of children, although they may take several years to disappear. If the spider angiomas are associated with pregnancy, they may resolve after childbirth. In women taking oral contraceptives, they may resolve after stopping these contraceptives.

For spider angiomas on the face, techniques such as electrodesiccation and laser treatment can be used to remove the lesion. There is a small risk of a scar; however, it usually leaves nothing.

== See also ==
- List of cutaneous conditions
