= Shear wave elastography =

Medical imaging methodology

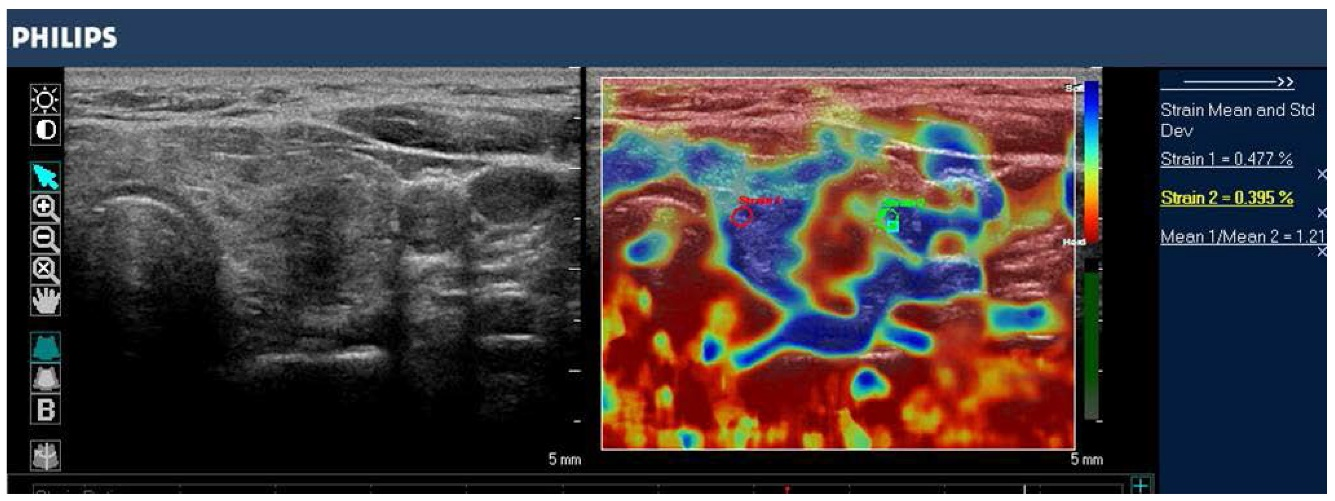
B-mode image (left) and color-coded elastogram (right) of a thyroid nodule. The blue color (soft tissue) represents normal thyroid tissue and the red color suggests a malignant nodule.

Shear wave elastography (SWE), as a type of elastography, is a non-invasive medical imaging technique used to quantitatively assess the elasticity and stiffness of tissues. The method excites the shear wave in the tissue by ultrasonic wave and captures the propagation speed of the shear wave with ultrasonic imaging equipment. The propagation speed of the shear wave is related to the elastic modulus of the tissue: in the harder tissue, the shear wave propagates faster, while in the softer tissue it propagates slower. SWE is widely used in the assessment of liver diseases (such as liver fibrosis), breast masses, thyroid nodules, and the musculoskeletal system to help diagnose the disease and monitor the effect of treatment. SWE is becoming an important tool in the field of soft tissue elastography because of its objective, quantitative and highly repeatable advantages over traditional manual palpation.

== Historical background ==
Ultrasound elastography (USE) is an imaging technique designed to detect and measure tissue stiffness, first introduced in the 1990s. Over the years, it has undergone significant advancements, allowing for quantitative evaluation of tissue elasticity. The ultrasound elastography gradually developed into four main types: compression sonoelastography, transient elastography, tension elastography, and shear wave elastography.

Recent studies have highlighted the growing potential of shear wave elastography (SWE) in assessing a wide range of traumatic and pathological conditions affecting musculoskeletal soft tissues. Promising findings have demonstrated its utility in evaluating the mechanical properties of tendons, muscles, nerves, and ligaments. For tendons, SWE has been used to assess stiffness changes associated with injuries, degeneration, and recovery processes, providing insights into conditions such as tendinopathy. In muscle evaluation, SWE has shown the ability to detect alterations in stiffness related to overuse, trauma, and neuromuscular disorders, offering valuable information for both diagnosis and rehabilitation monitoring. Furthermore, SWE has been increasingly applied to peripheral nerves, aiding in the detection of entrapment neuropathies, nerve injuries, and post-surgical changes. For ligaments, SWE provides a non-invasive method to evaluate their biomechanical integrity following injuries or reconstructive surgeries, facilitating better understanding and management of ligament-related disorders.

These advancements reflect the ongoing development of SWE as a reliable tool for non-invasive, quantitative assessment, making it a new addition to medical imaging and diagnostics.

== Basic physics ==
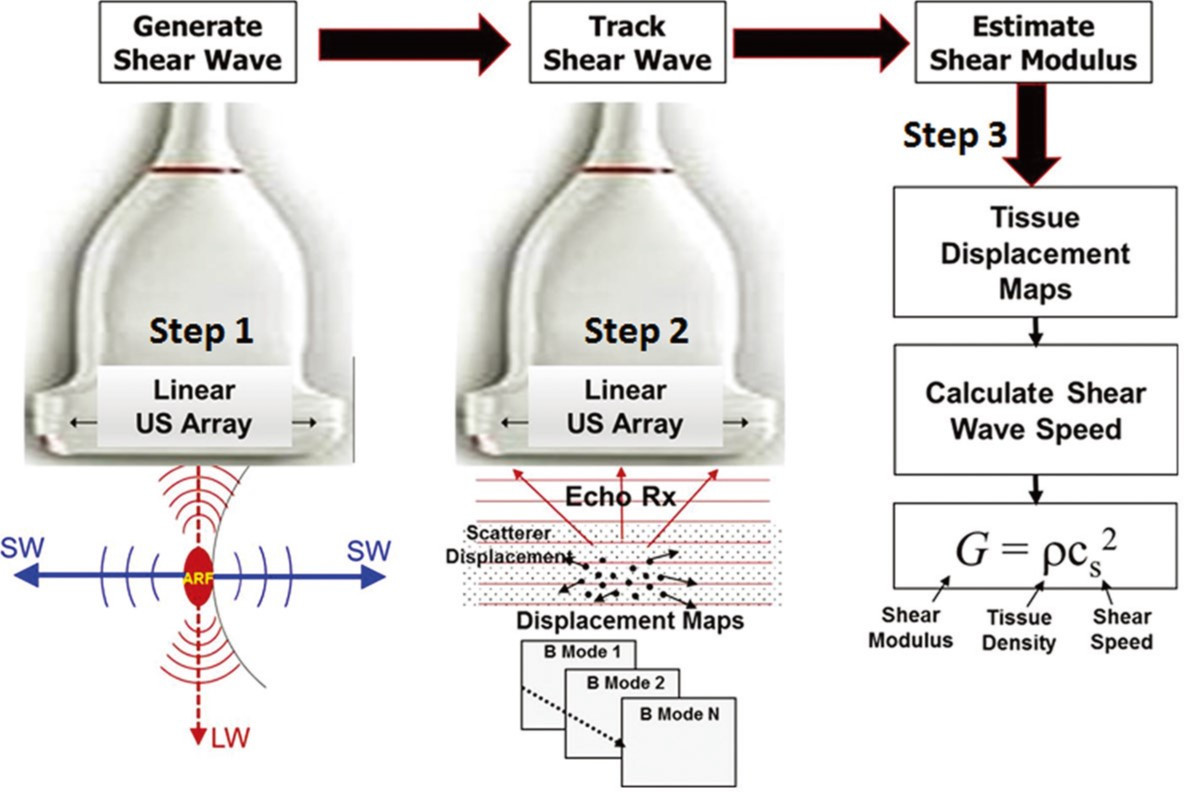
Basic physics of SWE including 3 steps. Step 1. ARF generating. Step 2. Shear wave tracing. Step 3. Shear modulus estimation.

The basic principle of SWE is to generate shear waves in tissues and detect their speed of propagation, so that the shear modulus could be indirectly derived. To better illustrate the basic physics of SWE, the process of it is divided into 3 steps, Acoustic Radiation Force (ARF) generation, shear wave tracing, and shear modulus estimation.

=== Acoustic Radiation Force (ARF) generation ===
The shear wave is in essence a transverse wave present in solids (such as human tissues) when the solid is subject to a periodic shear force. The generated shear wave will propagate in a direction perpendicular to the vibration. In shear wave elastography, shear waves are generated using focused acoustic radiation force (ARF) from a linear ultrasound array.

The Acoustic radiation force is a non-linear acoustical phenomenon. Basically, particles are subject to a net force in a gradient acoustic field. Although the ARF is widely used to manufacture acoustical tweezers and manipulate particles, it also has the capability to remotely generate displacements in tissue. Here, an ultrasound transducer array emits ultrasound pulses which converges at the focus, serving as the source of shear stress. Then the shear stress and strain waves propagate outwards.

=== Shear wave tracing ===
3D visualization of shear wave propagation.

Once shear waves are generated, they induce tissue displacement. Another ultrasound linear array is utilized to real-time image the displacement of tissue. Tissue displacement is calculated using a speckle tracking algorithm.

The shear wave speed at each pixel in the imaging plane is calculated using a time-of-flight method. This approach assumes that shear waves travel laterally within the plane. By analyzing signals from adjacent lateral positions, their correlation is used to measure the travel time of the shear wave between these points, allowing the determination of the local wave propagation speed.

=== Shear modulus estimation ===
The last step is to reconstruct the elasticity map from the collected signal. This shear wave velocity distribution across the imaging plane is closely associated with the shear modulus (G), which quantifies tissue stiffness and elasticity and is typically expressed in kilopascals. The shear modulus is derived using the equation $G=\rho c_s^2$, where ρ represents the tissue density and $c_s$ is the shear wave speed calculated from the previous step.

In soft tissue, the density is often approximated using values found in literature or assumed to be similar to water (1 g/cm³). For isotropic materials, the relationship between the shear modulus and Young's modulus can also be expressed as $E=2G(1+\nu)$ where $\nu$ is the Poisson ratio. Soft tissues under small deformations are typically treated as incompressible ($\nu=0.5$), simplifying the equation to $E=3G$. As a result, some studies report shear wave velocities or G, while others use E based on these relationships.

== Classification of SWE ==
There are several different categories of shear wave elastography, grouped based on their historical evolution and technical advancements.

=== Transient elastography (TE) ===
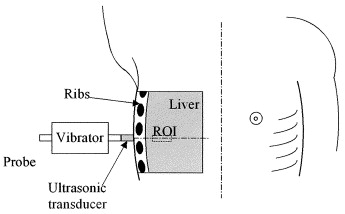
Transient elastography for liver elasticity measurement.

Unlike the previously introduced method, transient elastography (TE) uses low-frequency mechanical vibrations (approximately 50 Hz) to generate shear waves in the tissue. It functions by exciting shear stress with a vibrator so that the shear wave could be generated and penetrate the skin, and imaging the motion of the distortion of tissues by an ultrasonic transducer as the wave passes deeper into the body.

Key advantages of transient elastography include its simplicity, speed, and ability to provide real-time measurements. Transient elastography is widely used for liver fibrosis staging, particularly in conditions like hepatitis B and C. Studies have shown its effectiveness in detecting early liver fibrosis and portal hypertension. It is integrated into devices like FibroScan, offering a portable, efficient solution for liver stiffness measurements in clinical settings.

=== Point shear wave elastography (p‑SWE) ===
As acoustic radiation force being used to generate displacements in tissue, ultrasound elastography enters a new era. Despite the fact that ARF was originally use to push the tissue at one point and calculate its stiffness by measuring the displacement (the so called ARFI), researchers quickly found that a portion of the longitudinal waves generated by ARFI is converted to shear waves.

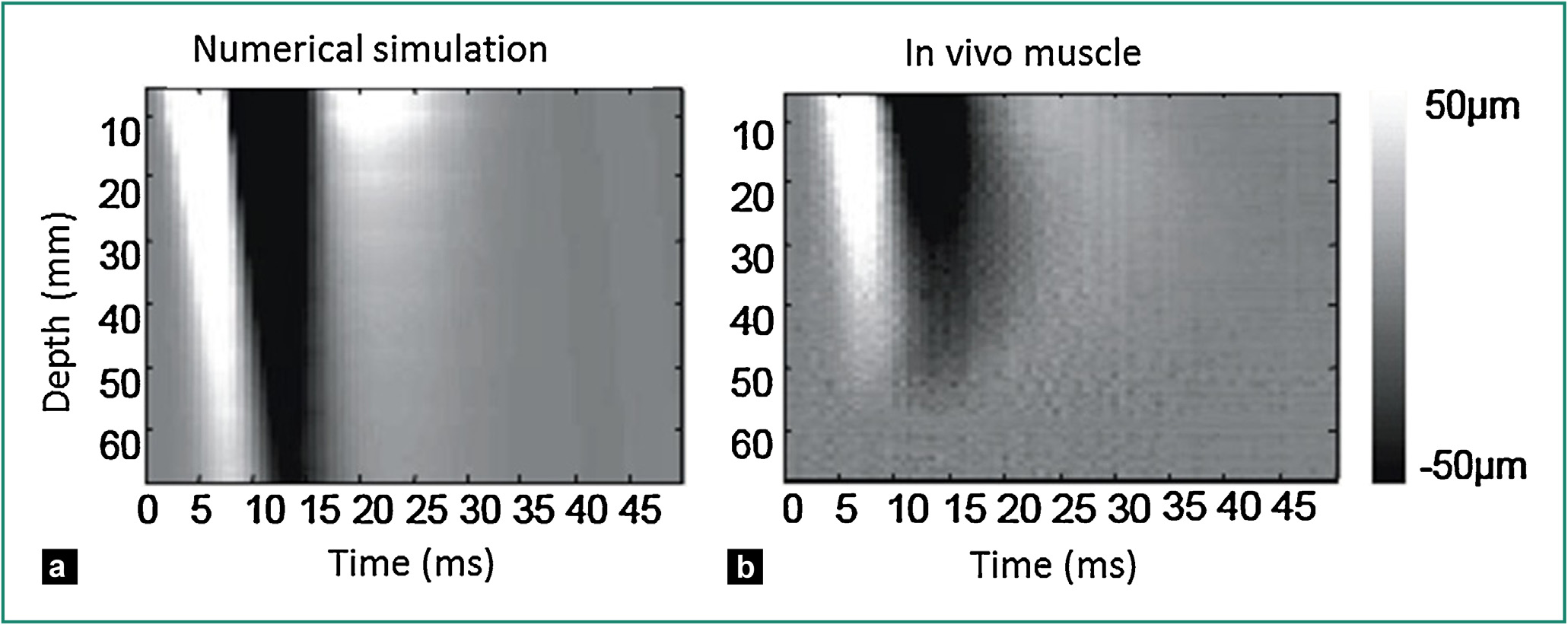
The time/depth profile from (a) numerical simulation and (b) a muscle in vivo. The extraction of the slope allows to work back to the speed of the shear wave and thus the Young's modulus of the medium.

Point shear wave elastography (p-SWE) is an advanced ultrasound elastography technique that uses acoustic radiation force impulse (ARFI) to induce tissue displacement. The displacement generated in that process is a function of depth and time. Then the speed is estimated by correlations of retro-diffused echoes (via ultrasound speckle) recorded at a framerate higher than one thousand time per second with a mono-dimensional ultrasound transducer (5 MHz). This speed is either reported directly or used to calculate the Young's modulus, providing a quantitative assessment of tissue elasticity.

Unlike 1D transient elastography, p-SWE can be conducted with standard ultrasound machines using conventional probes, making it more accessible in clinical settings. The technique is highly sensitive and precise, as it eliminates the need for manual compression, reducing variability caused by operator dependency.

=== Supersonic shear imaging (SSI) ===
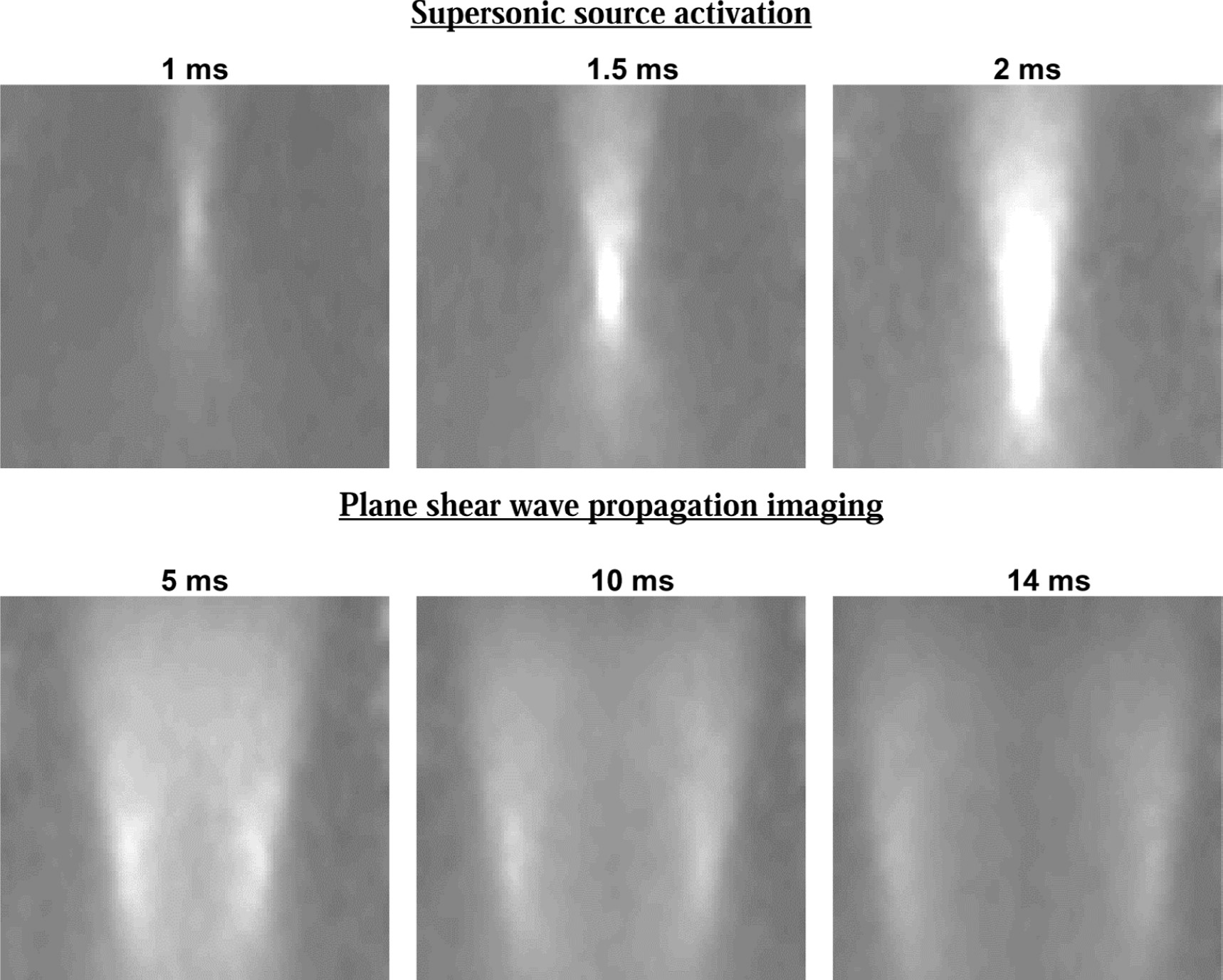
A series of supersonic focused point generate Mach 3 regime in an elastic phantom, which induces plane shear waves. Figures show displacements induced in the medium at 6 different time steps.

Supersonic shear imaging (SSI) generates shear wave vibration sources in tissues, moving at supersonic speeds to generate Mach cones, which in turn generate planar shear-waves, and images these shear-waves with another ultra-high speed (5000fps) probe. Shear wave composition can be achieved by changing the angle of Mach cone.

Previous transient elastic imaging uses external vibration sources to generate shear waves, the advantage is insensitive to patient movement, insensitive to artifacts generated by boundary conditions, the disadvantage is that the external oscillator is bulky, the shear wave directional mode is unique, will produce biased estimates. Solutions to these problems include: focusing ultrasound to produce ARF, using two beams of different-frequency ultrasound to produce low-frequency beats, SWEI and ARFI focusing ultrasound in the tissue for a longer period of time, measuring displacement, and calculating viscoelasticity as a function of displacement-time. However, the mechanical displacement depends on the shape of the beam, the absorption coefficient, and the heterogeneity of the shear wave at the focal point, so it is difficult to evaluate quantitatively.

SSI combines the advantages of the above methods and relies on ARF to generate low frequency quasi-plane shear waves, which can provide shear modulus within 30ms. Its innovation lies in the use of the cumulative effect of the phase interference of shear waves to produce large displacement. The shear wave propagating in both directions increases the effective region. Changing the Angle of the Mach cone and using shear wave recombination can increase the robustness.

=== Two-dimensional shear wave elastography (2D‑SWE) ===
Two-dimensional shear wave elastography (2D-SWE) is a widely used method for evaluating elasticity properties of tissues. Unlike p-SWE, which focuses on a single point, 2D-SWE excites multiple focal zones in rapid succession, producing a near-cylindrical shear wave cone. This allows real-time monitoring and measurement of shear wave speed and Young's modulus (E) over a two-dimensional plane, enabling the creation of quantitative elastograms.

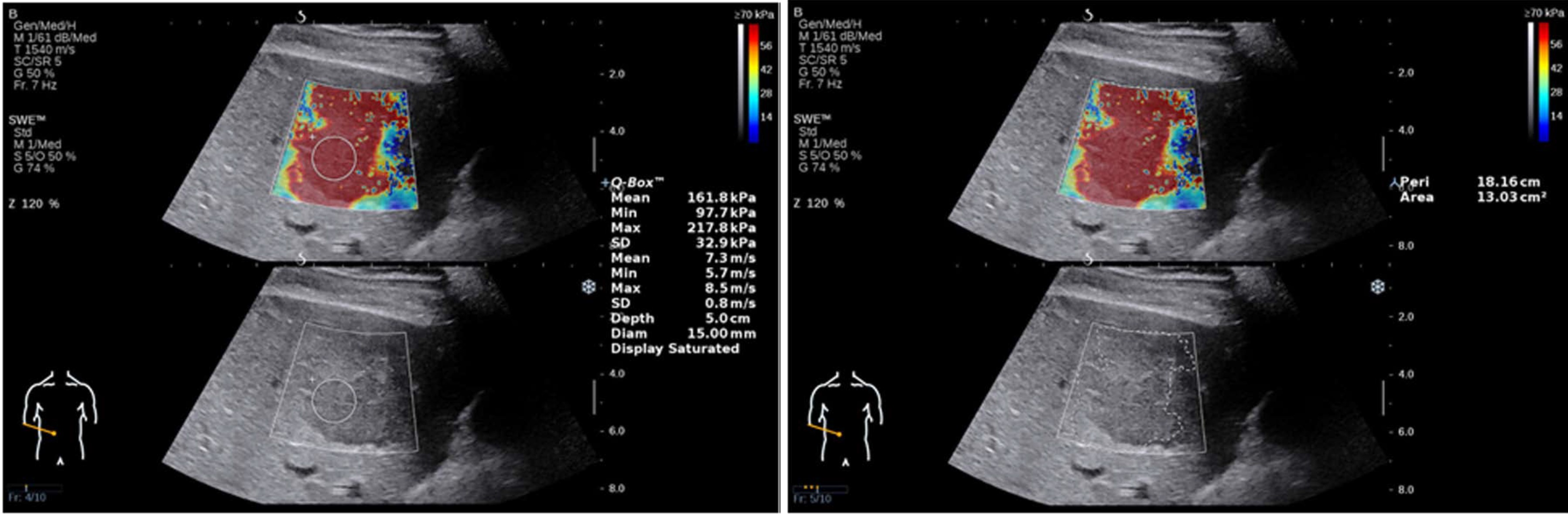
2D SWE of a 69-year-old male with hepatocellular carcinoma based on the cirrhosis. A. The mean Young's modulus is 161.8 kPa and the mean shear wave velocity is 7.3 m/s, obviously higher than the benign lesion; B. The area of the tumor is 13.03 cm².

A significant advantage of 2D-SWE is its ability to superimpose real-time color-coded elasticity maps onto B-mode ultrasound images. This integration of anatomical and stiffness information facilitates precise localization of abnormalities, enhancing diagnostic accuracy. It has been extensively applied in evaluating tissue stiffness in various clinical settings, including liver fibrosis staging (as the figure shows), breast lesion characterization, and thyroid nodule assessment.

Commercial systems supporting 2D-SWE include Siemens' Virtual Touch™ Imaging Quantification (VTIQ/ARFI), SuperSonic Imagine's Shear Wave™ Elastography, Philips' Shear Wave Elastography, Toshiba's Acoustic Structure Quantification™ (ASQ), and GE Healthcare's 2D-SWE system. These systems offer high reliability, but challenges such as signal attenuation in deep tissues and operator-dependent variability remain areas of active research and development.

The robust capabilities of 2D-SWE make it a preferred choice in clinical practice, combining diagnostic precision with ease of use in real-time imaging.

=== Three-dimensional shear wave elastography (3D‑SWE) ===
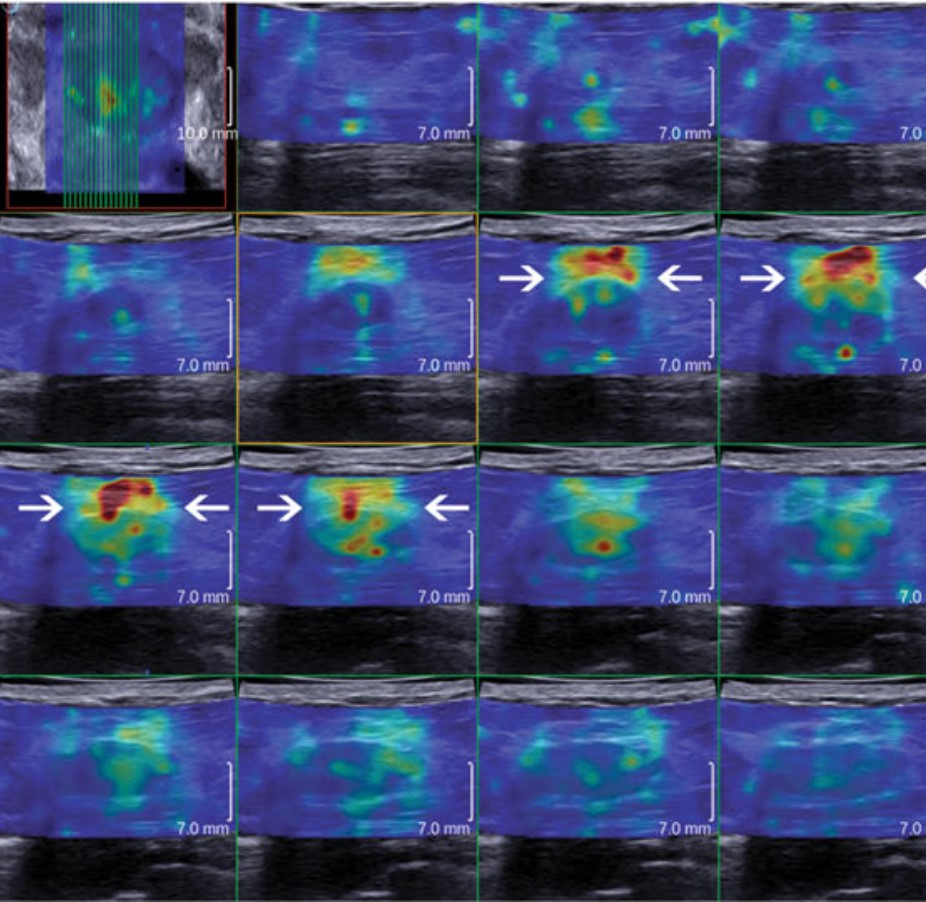
Multislice sagittal 3D SWE images of a 66-year-old woman with fibroadenoma at core biopsy. The stiff area continuing vertically from the cutaneous side is localised in the centre of the images (arrows). BI-RADS category 4a was assigned to the lesion.

Three-dimensional shear wave elastography (3D-SWE) expands on the principles of 2D-SWE by adding volumetric imaging capabilities. It generates 3D color-coded elasticity maps, providing detailed spatial distribution of tissue stiffness in a single acquisition. This allows the quantitative assessment of tissue stiffness in a broader volume, useful in applications such as breast, liver, and musculoskeletal evaluations. The figure on the right shows a group of 3D reconstructed images of a 66-year-old woman with fibroadenoma at core biopsy, the results indicating 4a BI-RADS category.

3D-SWE offers comparable results to two-dimensional SWE (2D-SWE), but its ability to provide multiplanar visualization and spatial organ mapping is a distinct advantage. However, challenges like location- and volume-dependent variability and system-specific measurement differences require further study. Applications include diagnosing scrotal masses and evaluating male infertility. While promising, 3D-SWE benefits from larger-scale studies to validate its role in clinical practice, particularly for enhanced volume calculations and lesion assessment in multiple dimensions.

== Clinical Applications ==
SWE is used for the investigation of various disease conditions in different parts of human body. Here some examples are given to demonstrate the applications of SWE.

=== Liver fibrosis ===
Shear wave imaging has shown potential for non-invasive assessment of liver fibrosis. Although tissue biopsy is still the gold standard for diagnosis of liver fibrosis, shear wave imaging is a non-invasive diagnostic method that can well reflect the fibrosis status of the entire liver. However, liver SWE has its shortcomings. For example, measurements can be confounded by both pathologic and normal physiologic processes. Besides, several disease processes including liver inflammation, passive hepatic congestion may also have bad influence on the measurement of SWE.

=== Breast cancer ===
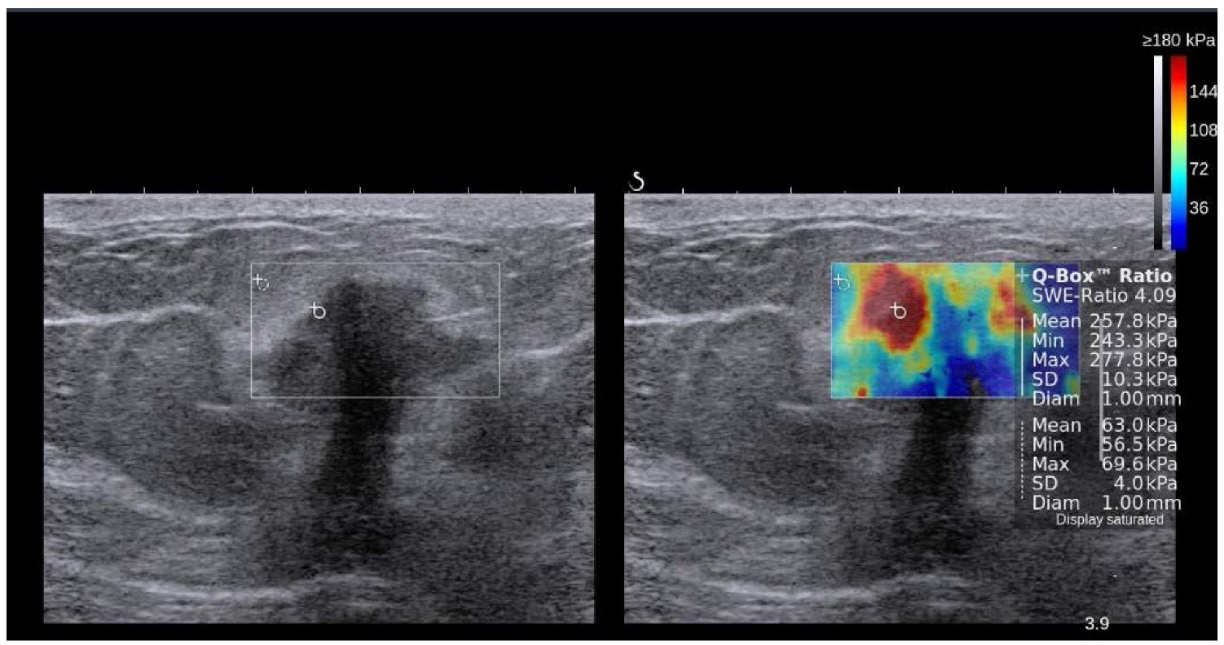
A B-mode ultrasound image and a color-coded stiffness map of a breast lesion, with red indicating high stiffness. The lesion's irregular shape and increased stiffness suggested malignancy, confirmed as ductal adenocarcinoma via biopsy.

Although mammography and ultrasound are the most commonly used breast cancer screening methods, they both have some limitations, such as the presence of false-negative results in dense breast mammography, and the problem of relatively poor specificity in B-mode ultrasound. Shear wave elastography (SWE) can be used as a complementary tool to improve the non-invasive characterization of breast lesions. The picture on the right is an example of SWE on breast cancer.

SWE on diagnosing breast cancer has limitations, including the lack of standardized elastogram color coding and challenges in assessing heterogeneous or deep lesions. Some benign lesions may appear stiff, while malignant ones can occasionally seem soft, requiring careful analysis of surrounding tissues.

=== Thyroid nodules ===
Thyroid nodules are a common finding in the general population, present in up to 67% of adults by high resolution B-mode ultrasound. SWE shows promise in diagnosing thyroid malignancy, particularly in follicular neoplasms, potentially reducing unnecessary total thyroidectomies. However, SWE in thyroid nodules diagnosis faces challenges, including operator-dependent variability, limited effectiveness in nodules with calcifications or cystic components, and inaccuracies in large or fibrotic nodules. Standardization and larger cohort studies are needed to address variability and selection bias in current research

=== Tendons and Muscles ===
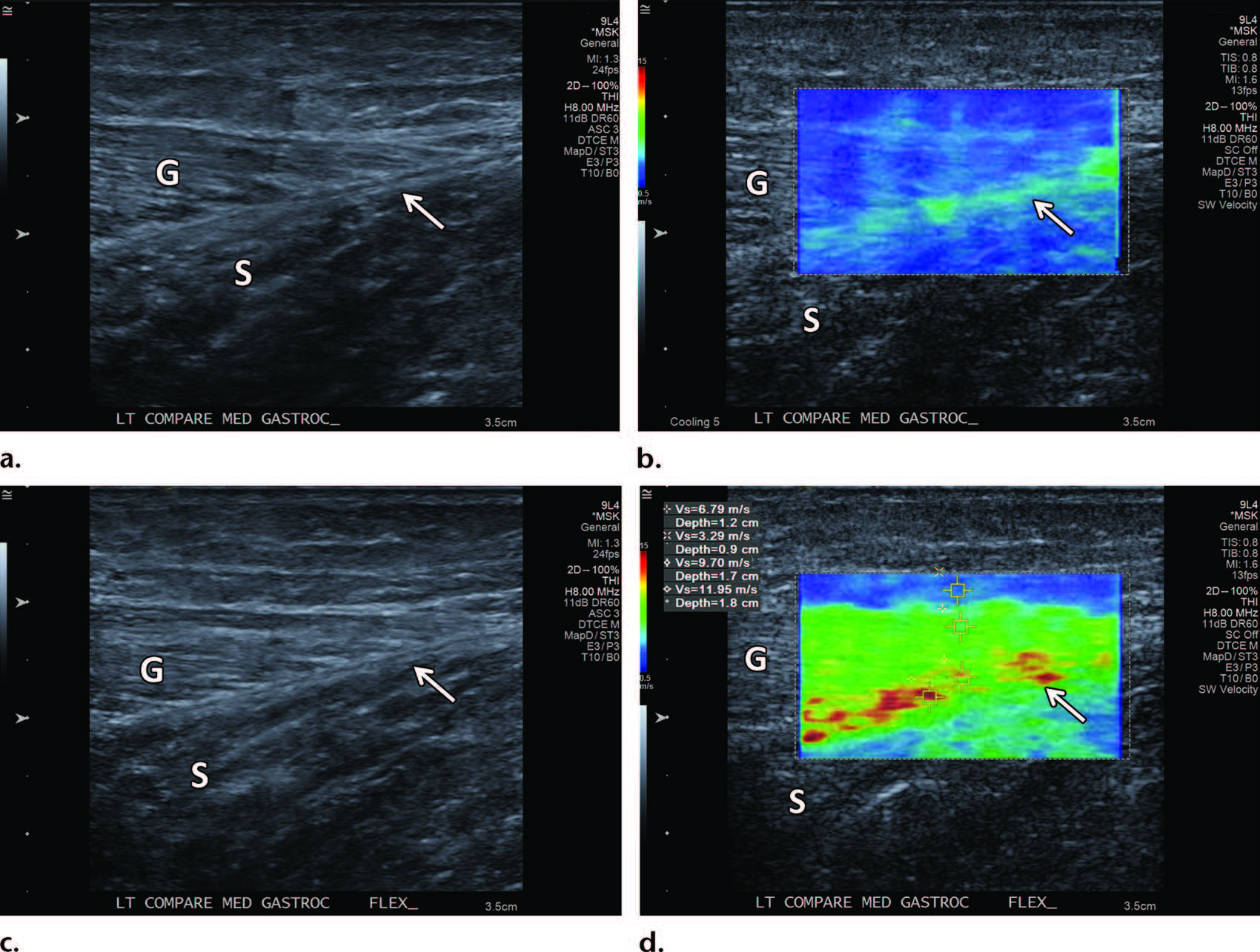
B-mode as well as SWE imaging of normal medial head of gastrocnemius and soleus aponeurosis in the (a)(b) relaxed and (c)(d) contracted (maximal dorsiflexion of the ankle) states in an asymptomatic 48-year-old woman

Recent studies on shear wave elastography (SWE) of tendons and muscles have shown promising results, with most being experimental and some clinical.

SWE findings suggest that shear waves travel faster in healthy or contracted tendons and muscles than in diseased or relaxed ones, and propagation is faster along the tendon's long axis than the short axis.

These insights highlight SWE's potential in assessing tendon and muscle health.

=== Others ===
SWE is widely used in the measurement of many other human tissues like kidney, lymph node, prostate, nerves, joints and ligaments, and so on.

SWE has been used in evaluating a wide range of tissues, providing diagnostic insights into their mechanical properties. As its clinical applications continue to expand, SWE shows may improve disease diagnosis, treatment planning, and patient monitoring across medical fields. Future developments, such as improved imaging resolution, standardization of protocols, and integration with AI, may further refine its diagnostic accuracy and broaden its utility, establishing SWE as an indispensable tool in personalized medicine.
