= Acute liver failure =

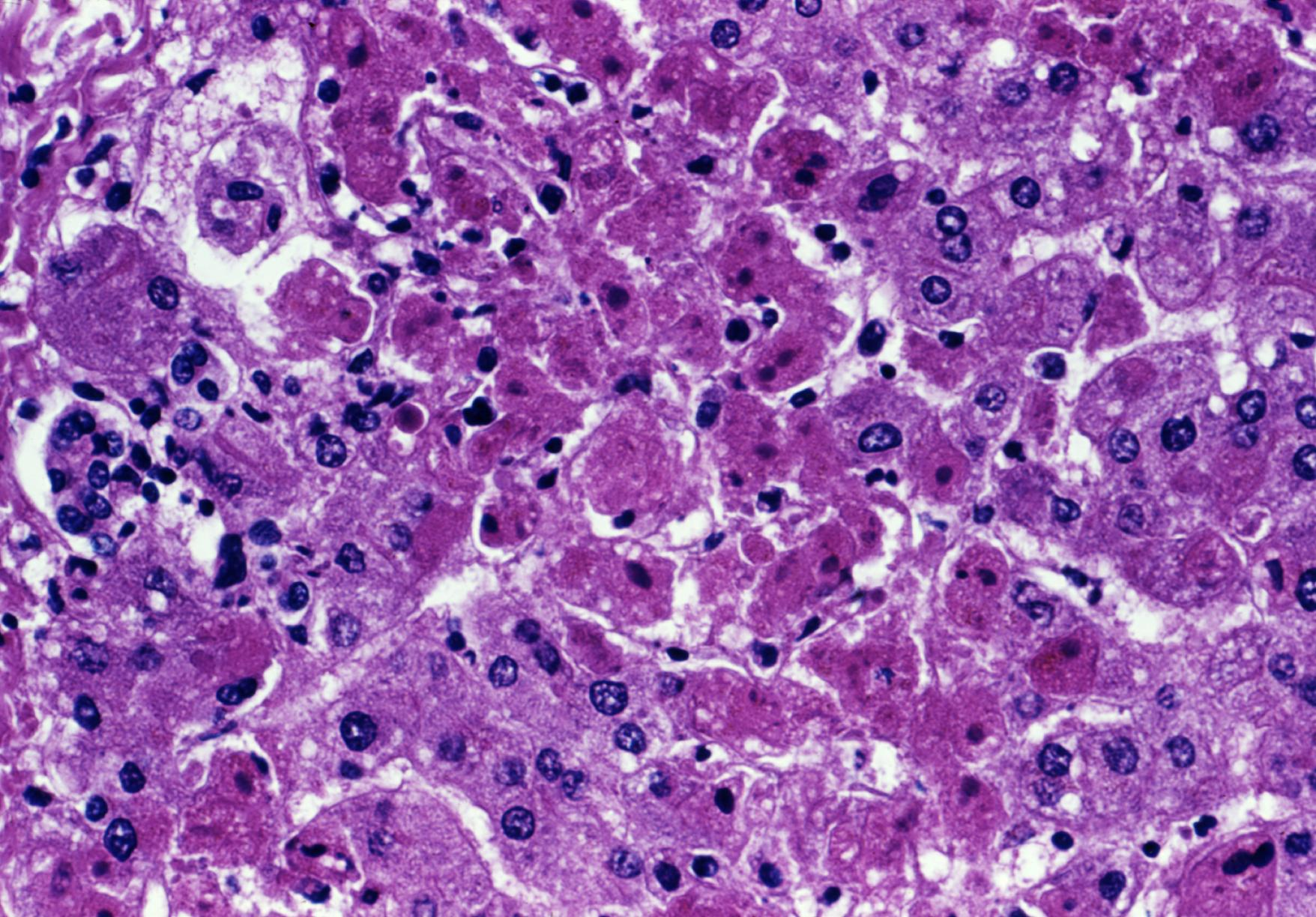
- Acute liver failure (with hepatocellular necrosis and sinusoidal bleeding) from Marburg virus, a rare cause
- Specialty: Gastroenterology, hepatology, intensive care medicine
- Symptoms: Jaundice, excessive bleeding, altered state of consciousness, hyperdynamic circulation, hepatocellular necrosis, low blood pressure
- Complications: Hepatic encephalopathy, kidney failure, thrombocytopenia, hyponatraemia
- Diagnostic method: Prothrombin time measurement, complete blood count
- Treatment: Liver transplant

Acute liver failure is the appearance of severe complications rapidly after the first signs (such as jaundice) of liver disease, and indicates that the liver has sustained severe damage (loss of function of 80–90% of liver cells). The complications are hepatic encephalopathy and impaired protein synthesis (as measured by the levels of serum albumin and the prothrombin time in the blood). The 1993 classification defines hyperacute as within 1 week, acute as 8–28 days, and subacute as 4–12 weeks; both the speed with which the disease develops and the underlying cause strongly affect outcomes.

== Signs and symptoms ==
The main features of acute liver failure are rapid-onset jaundice, weakness, and eventually, changes in mental status that can begin as mild confusion but progress to coma, known as hepatic encephalopathy.

=== Encephalopathy and cerebral edema ===
In ALF, hepatic encephalopathy leads to cerebral edema, coma, brain herniation, and eventually death. Detection of encephalopathy is central to the diagnosis of ALF. It may vary from subtle deficit in higher brain function (e.g. mood, concentration in grade I) to deep coma (grade IV). Patients presenting as acute and hyperacute liver failure are at greater risk of developing cerebral edema and grade IV encephalopathy. The pathogenesis remains unclear, but is likely to be a consequence of several phenomena. There is a buildup of toxic substances like ammonia, mercaptan, serotonin and tryptophan in the brain. This affects neurotransmitter level and neuroreceptor activation. Autoregulation of cerebral blood flow is impaired, and is associated with anaerobic glycolysis and oxidative stress. Neuronal cell astrocytes are susceptible to these changes, and they swell up, resulting in increased intracranial pressure. Inflammatory mediators also play important role.

Unfortunately, signs of elevated intracranial pressure, such as papilledema and loss of pupillary reflexes, are not reliable, and occur late in the disease process. CT imaging of the brain is also unhelpful in detecting early cerebral oedema, but is often performed to rule out intra-cerebral bleeding. Invasive intracranial pressure monitoring via subdural route is often recommended; however, the risk of complications must be weighed against the possible benefit (1% fatal haemorrhage). The aim is to maintain intracranial pressures below 25 mm Hg, and cerebral perfusion pressures above 50 mm Hg.

=== Coagulopathy ===
Coagulopathy is another cardinal feature of ALF. The liver has the central role in the synthesis of almost all coagulation factors and some inhibitors of coagulation and fibrinolysis. Hepatocellular necrosis leads to impaired synthesis of many coagulation factors and their inhibitors. The former produces a prolongation in prothrombin time which is widely used to monitor the severity of hepatic injury. There is significant platelet dysfunction (with both quantitative and qualitative platelet defects). Progressive thrombocytopenia with the loss of larger and more active platelets is almost universal. Thrombocytopenia with or without DIC increases risk of intracerebral bleeding.

=== Kidney failure ===
Kidney failure is common, present in more than 50% of ALF patients, either due to original insult such as paracetamol resulting in acute tubular necrosis or from hyperdynamic circulation leading to hepatorenal syndrome or functional kidney failure. Because of impaired production of urea, blood urea does not represent the degree of kidney impairment.

=== Inflammation and infection ===
About 60% of all ALF patients fulfil the criteria for systemic inflammatory syndrome irrespective of presence or absence of infection. This often contributes towards multi organ failure. Impaired host defence mechanism, due to impaired opsonization, chemotaxis and intracellular killing, substantially increases risk of sepsis. Bacterial sepsis mostly due to gram positive organisms and fungal sepsis are observed in up to 80% and 30% patients, respectively.

=== Metabolic derangements ===
Hyponatraemia is an almost universal finding due to water retention and a shift in intracellular sodium transport from inhibition of Na/K ATPase. Hypoglycaemia (due to depleted hepatic glycogen store and hyperinsulinaemia), hypokalaemia, hypophosphataemia and metabolic alkalosis are often present, independent of renal function. Lactic acidosis occurs predominantly in paracetamol (also known as acetaminophen) overdose.

=== Haemodynamic and cardio-respiratory compromise ===
Hyperdynamic circulation, with peripheral vasodilatation from low systemic vascular resistance, leads to hypotension. There is a compensatory increase in cardiac output. Adrenal insufficiency has been documented in 60% of ALF cases, and is likely to contribute in haemodynamic compromise. There is also abnormal oxygen transport and utilization. Although delivery of oxygen to the tissues is adequate, there is a decrease in tissue oxygen uptake, resulting in tissue hypoxia and lactic acidosis.

Pulmonary complications occur in up to 50% of patients. Severe lung injury and hypoxemia result in high mortality. Most cases of severe lung injury are due to ARDS, with or without sepsis. Pulmonary haemorrhage, pleural effusions, atelectasis, and intrapulmonary shunts also contribute to respiratory difficulty.

=== Late pregnancy ===
In late pregnancy liver function decreases significantly, which can be easily monitored by blood tests. Early clinical manifestations of ALF in late pregnancy include hypodynamia, decrease in appetite, dark amber urine, deep jaundice, nausea, vomiting, and abdominal distention. Among patients whose deaths were attributed to ALF in late pregnancy, the majority had experienced vaginal deliveries.

== Causes ==
Common causes for acute liver failure are paracetamol (acetaminophen) overdose, idiosyncratic reaction to medication (e.g. tetracycline, troglitazone), excessive alcohol consumption (severe alcoholic hepatitis), viral hepatitis (hepatitis A or B—it is extremely uncommon in hepatitis C), acute fatty liver of pregnancy, and idiopathic (without an obvious cause). Reye syndrome is acute liver failure in a child with a viral infection (e.g. chickenpox); it appears that aspirin use may play a significant role. Wilson's disease (hereditary copper accumulation) may infrequently present with acute liver failure. Acute liver failure also results from poisoning by the death cap mushroom (Amanita phalloides) as well as other amatoxin-producing fungus species. Certain strains of Bacillus cereus—a common species of bacterium implicated as a frequent cause of food poisoning—can cause fulminant liver failure through the production of cereulide, a toxin which destroys the mitochondria in affected hepatocytes, resulting in cell death. While most instances of B. cereus infection are resolved by the body's immune system and do not affect the liver, severe cases resulting in liver damage can be fatal without immediate treatment or liver transplantation.

== Pathophysiology ==
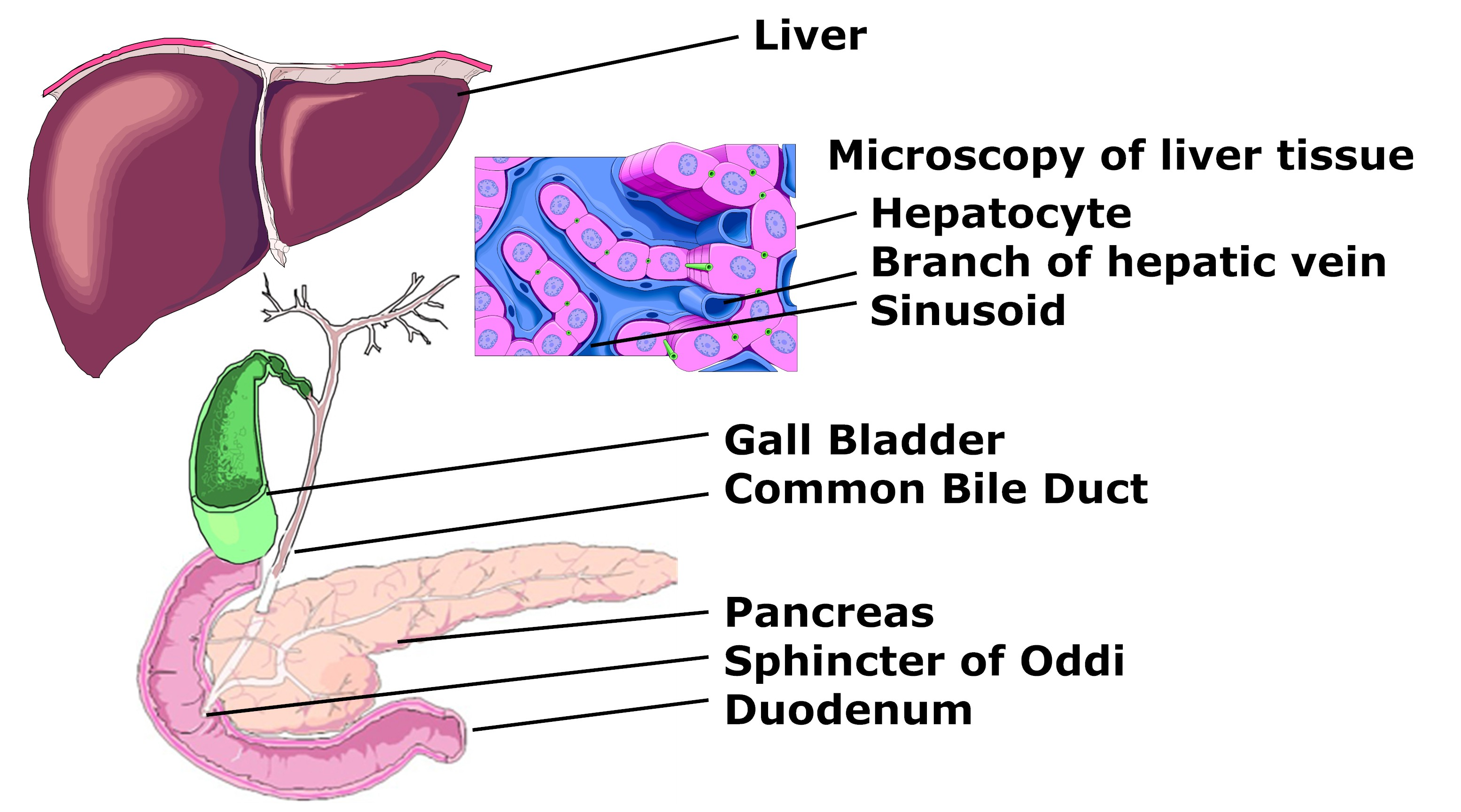
Diagram of hepatobiliary system

In the majority of acute liver failure (ALF) there is widespread hepatocellular necrosis beginning in the centrizonal distribution and progressing towards portal tracts. The degree of parenchymal inflammation is variable and is proportional to duration of disease.

Zone 1 (periportal) occurs in phosphorus poisoning or eclampsia. Zone 2 (mid-zonal), although rare, is seen in yellow fever. Zone 3 (centrilobular) occurs with ischemic injury, toxic effects, carbon tetrachloride exposure, or chloroform ingestion. In acute acetaminophen overdose, toxification occurs, mostly in Zone III which has the highest level of P450 micro-enzymes. That fact along with Zone III's decreased oxygen level helps to explain why it is preferentially one of the initial sites of damage.

== Diagnosis ==
All patients with clinical or laboratory evidence of moderate to severe acute hepatitis should have an immediate measurement of prothrombin time and careful evaluation of mental status. If the prothrombin time is prolonged by ≈ 4–6 seconds or more (INR ≥ 1.5), and there is any evidence of altered sensorium, the diagnosis of ALF should be strongly suspected, and hospital admission is mandatory. Initial laboratory examination must be extensive in order to evaluate both the etiology and severity.

Initial laboratory analysis

- Prothrombin time/INR
- Complete blood count
- Chemistries
  - Liver function test: AST, ALT, alkaline phosphatase, GGT, total bilirubin, albumin
  - Creatinine, urea/blood urea nitrogen, sodium, potassium, chloride, bicarbonate, calcium, magnesium, phosphate
  - Glucose
  - Amylase and lipase
- Arterial blood gas, lactate
- Blood type and screen
- Paracetamol (acetaminophen) level, toxicology screen
- Viral hepatitis serologies: anti-HAV IgM, HBSAg, anti-HBc IgM, anti-HCV
- Autoimmune markers: ANA, ASMA, LKMA, immunoglobulin levels
- Ceruloplasmin level (when Wilson's disease suspected)
- Pregnancy test (females)
- Ammonia (arterial if possible)
- HIV status (has implication for transplantation)

History taking should include a careful review of possible exposures to viral infection and drugs or other toxins. From history and clinical examination, the possibility of underlying chronic disease should be ruled out as it may require different management.

A liver biopsy done via the transjugular route because of coagulopathy is not usually necessary, other than in occasional malignancies. As the evaluation continues, several important decisions have to be made; such as whether to admit the patient to an ICU, or whether to transfer the patient to a transplant facility. Consultation with the transplant center as early as possible is critical due to the possibility of rapid progression of ALF.

=== Definition ===
Acute liver failure is defined as "the rapid development of hepatocellular dysfunction, specifically coagulopathy and mental status changes (encephalopathy) in a patient without known prior liver disease".^{page 1557}

The diagnosis of acute liver failure is based on physical exam, laboratory findings, patient history, and past medical history to establish mental status changes, coagulopathy, rapidity of onset, and absence of known prior liver disease respectively.^{page 1557}

The exact definition of "rapid" is somewhat questionable, and different sub-divisions exist which are based on the time from onset of first hepatic symptoms to onset of encephalopathy. One scheme defines "acute hepatic failure" as the development of encephalopathy within 26 weeks of the onset of any hepatic symptoms. This is sub-divided into "fulminant hepatic failure", which requires onset of encephalopathy within 8 weeks, and "subfulminant", which describes onset of encephalopathy after 8 weeks but before 26 weeks. Another scheme defines "hyperacute" as onset within 7 days, "acute" as onset between 7 and 28 days, and "subacute" as onset between 28 days and 24 weeks.^{page 1557}

== Treatment ==
King's College Hospital criteria

for liver transplantation in acute liver failure

Patients with paracetamol toxicity

pH < 7.3 or
Prothrombin time > 100 seconds and
serum creatinine level > 3.4 mg/dL (> 300 μmol/L)
if in grade III or IV encephalopathy

Other patients

Prothrombin time > 100 seconds or
Three of the following variables:

- Age < 10 yr or > 40 years
- Cause:
  - Hepatitis C or E
  - halothane hepatitis
  - idiosyncratic drug reaction
- Duration of jaundice before encephalopathy > 7 days
- Prothrombin time > 50 seconds
- Serum bilirubin level > 17.6 mg/dL (> 300 μmol/L)

=== General concerns ===
Because ALF often involves the rapid deterioration of mental status and the potential for multiorgan failure, patients should be managed in the intensive care unit. For patients not at a transplant center, the possibility of rapid progression of ALF makes early consultation with a transplant facility critical. Accordingly, plans for transfer to a transplant center should begin in patients with any abnormal mentation. Early institution of antidotes or specific therapy may prevent the need for liver transplantation and reduce the likelihood of poor outcome. Measures appropriate for specific causes of ALF are described in detail later in this chapter.

=== Neurologic complications ===
Patients with grade I–II encephalopathy should be transferred to a liver transplant facility and listed for transplantation. Consider a brain computed tomography (CT) scan to rule out other causes of altered or impaired mental status. Stimulation and overhydration can cause elevations in intracranial pressure (ICP) and should be avoided. Unmanageable agitation may be treated with short-acting benzodiazepines in small doses. Lactulose can be considered at this stage. A preliminary report from the ALFSG on 117 patients suggests that use of lactulose in the first 7 days after diagnosis is associated with a small increase in survival time, but with no difference in severity of encephalopathy or in the overall outcome. For patients who progress to grade III–IV encephalopathy, intubation for airway protection is generally required. Many centers use propofol for sedation because it may reduce cerebral blood. The head of the bed should be elevated to 30 degrees, and electrolytes, blood gasses, glucose, and neurologic status monitored frequently.

=== Cardiovascular complications ===
Increased cardiac output and low systemic vascular resistance are characteristic of ALF. Pulmonary artery catheterization should be considered. Hypotension should be treated preferentially with fluids, but systemic vasopressor support with agents such as epinephrine, norepinephrine, or dopamine should be used if fluid replacement fails to maintain mean arterial pressure of 50–60 mm Hg. Vasoconstrictive agents (especially vasopressin) should be avoided.

=== Pulmonary complications ===
Pulmonary edema and pulmonary infections are commonly seen in patients with ALF. Mechanical ventilation may be required. However, positive end-expiratory pressure can worsen cerebral edema.

=== Coagulopathy and gastrointestinal bleeding ===
Impaired liver synthesis of clotting factors, low-grade fibrinolysis, and intravascular coagulation are typical of ALF. Thrombocytopenia is common and may also be dysfunctional. Replacement therapy is recommended only in the setting of bleeding or prior to an invasive procedure. Vitamin K can be given to treat an abnormal prothrombin time, regardless of whether there is poor nutritional status. Administration of recombinant factor VIIa has shown promise; however, this treatment approach requires further study. The use of gastrointestinal hemorrhage prophylaxis with a histamine-2 (H2) blocker, proton pump inhibitor, or sucralfate is recommended.

=== Nutrition, electrolytes, and metabolic derangements ===
In patients with grade I or II encephalopathy, enteral feeding should be initiated early. Parenteral nutrition should be used only if enteral feeding is contraindicated as it increases the risk of infection. Severe restriction of protein is not beneficial; 60 g/day of protein is generally reasonable. Fluid replacement with colloid (e.g. albumin) is preferred rather than crystalloid (e.g. saline); all solutions should contain dextrose to maintain euglycemia. Multiple electrolyte abnormalities are common in ALF. Correction of hypokalemia is essential as hypokalemia increases the kidneys' ammonia production, potentially exacerbating encephalopathy. Hypophosphatemia is especially common in patients with acetaminophen-induced ALF and in those with intact renal function. Hypoglycemia occurs in many patients with ALF and is often due to depletion of hepatic glycogen stores and impaired gluconeogenesis. Plasma glucose concentration should be monitored and hypertonic glucose administered as needed.

=== Infection ===
Bacterial and fungal infections are common in ALF, with one study demonstrating culture-proven infection in 80% of ALF patients. Defective cellular and humoral immunity as well as presence of indwelling catheters, coma, broad-spectrum antibiotics, and medications that suppress immunity all predispose to infection. Localizing symptoms of infection such as fever and sputum production are frequently absent and the only clues to an underlying infectious process may be worsening of encephalopathy or renal function. There must be a low threshold for obtaining frequent cultures (blood, urine, and sputum), chest radiographs, and paracentesis. Bacteria that enter through the skin, such as streptococci and staphylococci, tend to predominate. Aggressive surveillance is essential as prophylactic antibiotics have shown little benefit. Fungal infections, particularly in the setting of broad-spectrum antibiotics, are also common, and disseminated fungemia is a poor prognostic sign.

=== Liver transplantation ===
The advent of transplantation has changed survival from as low as 15% in the pretransplant era to more than 60% today. Liver transplantation is indicated for many patients with ALF, and survival rates of 56–90% can be achieved. In addition to transplantation, better critical care and the trend toward more benign causes, such as acetaminophen, all contribute to improved survival rates. Spontaneous survival is now around 40%. The application of transplantation among patients with ALF remains low, suggesting that the full potential of this modality may not be realized. Timely availability of an allograft is one of the major factors determining transplant outcomes. In the largest U.S. study, only 29% of patients received a liver graft, while 10% of the overall group (one fourth of patients listed for transplantation) died on the waiting list. Other series have reported death rates of those listed for transplant as high as 40%. In the ALFSG, the transplantation rate was higher in the groups with lower short-term spontaneous survival, making overall survival similar in all groups: acetaminophen, 73%; drug induced, 70%; indeterminate group, 64%; and other causes, 61%. Causes of death for the 101 patients who died within the 3-week period included cerebral edema, multiorgan failure, sepsis, cardiac arrhythmia or arrest and respiratory failure. The median time to death after admission was 5 days.

=== Acetylcysteine ===
Intravenous N-acetylcysteine has been found to be beneficial in acetaminophen toxicity but not in non-acetaminophen-related acute liver failure.

== Prognosis ==
Historically mortality has been high, being in excess of 80%. In recent years the advent of liver transplantation and multidisciplinary intensive care support have improved survival significantly. At present overall short-term survival with transplant is more than 65%.

Several prognostic scoring systems have been devised to predict mortality and to identify who will require an early liver transplant. These include King's College Hospital criteria, MELD score, and Clichy criteria.

== Terminology ==
To date, no universally accepted nomenclature has been adopted. Trey and Davidson introduced the phrase fulminant hepatic failure in 1970, which they described as a "... potentially reversible condition, the consequence of severe liver injury, with an onset of encephalopathy within 8 weeks of the appearance of the first symptoms and in the absence of pre-existing liver disease". Later, it was suggested that the term fulminant should be confined to patients who develop jaundice to encephalopathy within 2 weeks. Phrases subfulminant hepatic failure and late onset hepatic failure were coined for onset between 2 weeks to 3 months and for 8 weeks to 24 weeks, respectively. The umbrella phrase of acute liver failure was proposed by King's College group, which has been adopted in this article. Paradoxically, in this classification, the best prognosis is in the hyperacute group.
