= Idiopathic head tremor =

Animal disorder of unknown origin

- Symptoms: Involuntary lateral, up-and-down movement of the head
- Duration: Less than five minutes
- Types: Between 6 months and 3 years
- Diagnostic method: Signalment and medical history

Idiopathic head tremors (IHT) are characterized by involuntary lateral or vertical movement of the head. Idiopathic head tremors are ordinarily considered a benign disease of the dog characterized by uncontrollable head tremors of spontaneous initiation and cessation. These head tremors are considered idiopathic because the cause is not apparent, but nervous system disorders, seizures and head injuries may be significant contributors to idiopathic head tremors in dogs. Head tremors are usually not associated with any other symptoms, although some dogs have other signs of disease in addition to head tremors.

== Cause ==
The cause is idiopathic, or unknown. One commonly accepted theory is dyskinesia that originates in the basal ganglia of the brain, which is responsible for motor control. Other possible causes are low glucose and/or calcium levels in the blood, often experienced by lactating dogs. Hormonal fluctuations may be a factor as well, since idiopathic head tremors are often more pronounced during estrus.

== Diagnosis ==
The diagnosis of idiopathic head tremors in dogs is based on signalment and medical history. It is considered a diagnosis of exclusion, meaning other possible causes must be investigated and ruled out before diagnosing idiopathic head tremors. Differential diagnoses include primary neurologic diseases like cerebellar disorders, steroid-responsive tremor syndrome ("little white shaker syndrome"), and exposure to toxins. Endocrine/metabolic diseases like hepatic encephalopathy and infectious diseases like rabies and canine distemper must also be ruled out. The first step is a comprehensive physical examination, including obtaining vital signs, auscultation of the heart, and palpation of the head, neck, and limbs. Additional testing includes a bile acid test, eye exam, brain MRI, and cerebrospinal fluid (CSF) analysis. These tests will enable the veterinarian to rule out progressive central nervous system or ocular disorders. Dogs with idiopathic head tremors have no other neurological abnormalities, and both MRI and cerebrospinal fluid analyses produce normal results.

== Treatment ==
There is no treatment available for idiopathic head tremors. Anticonvulsants have not been shown to have an effect on curbing the occurrence of head tremors. For dogs that are actively having an episode, distraction techniques may be helpful. Talking to the dog or offering food and treats are methods of distraction.

Although there is no treatment, prognosis is considered to be good because idiopathic head tremors are benign and do not lead to long term disease or illness.
