= Clichy criteria =

Proposed criteria to determine Acute liver failure

The Clichy criteria, also called the Beaujon-Paul Brousse criteria, are a group of criteria proposed to predict the survival of individuals with acute liver failure. It was based on a study of patients presenting with viral hepatitis, of which individuals with the lowest survival were identified. The King's College Criteria are more commonly used. Other prognostic models include Acute Liver Failure Early Dynamic (ALFED) model, Model for End-Stage Liver Disease (MELD) score, and the Acute Liver Failure Study Group (ALFSG) Index.

Two criteria predicted the prognosis of patients with poor survival:

- Factor V level less than 20 percent of its normal value in individuals less than thirty years of age
- Factor V level less than 30 percent of its normal value in individuals greater than thirty years of age.

The positive predictive value of mortality was 82% and the negative predictive value of mortality was 98% in individuals meeting these criteria.
