= Piecemeal =

Piecemeal denotes something being done piece by piece or one stage at a time.

Piecemeal may also refer to:

- Piecemeal (Gilbert Benson), a fictional character in the Marvel Universe
- Piecemeal (Cyborg villain), another fictional character in the Marvel Universe
- Piecemeal necrosis, a necrosis that occurs in fragments

== See also ==
- Peasemeal
