= JKB-122 =

Investigational molecule and TLR4 antagonist

Legal status
- Legal status: Investigational

Identifiers
- CAS Number: 2640012-69-5

JKB-122 is an investigational small molecule, long-acting toll-like receptor 4 (TLR4) antagonist developed for autoimmune hepatitis and nonalcoholic fatty liver disease. The drug was transferred to Biostax in 2022.
