= LKM =

LKM or lkm may refer to:

== Places ==
- Race Course Road, officially known as Lok Kalyan Marg, a road in New Delhi, India
  - 7, Race Course Road, officially known as 7, Lok Kalyan Marg, the official residence and principal workplace of the Prime Minister of India
- Lokomotivbau Karl Marx, a factory complex in East Germany, formerly owned by Orenstein & Koppel

== Other uses ==
- Liver kidney microsomal, the target of an Anti-LKM antibody
- LKM Leszno, a former name of the Polish motorcycle racing team Unia Leszno
- Loadable kernel module, an object code file used to extend the kernel of a computer's operating system
