= Alzheimer type II astrocyte =

Suspected pathological cell type in the brain

The Alzheimer type II astrocyte is thought to be a pathological type of cell in the brain; however, its exact pathology remains unknown. Like other astrocytes, it is a non-neuronal glial cell. It's mainly seen in diseases that cause increased levels of ammonia (hyperammonemia), such as chronic liver disease and Wilson's disease.

They are not associated with Alzheimer's disease, but were first described by the same neuroscientist who first described the eponymous disease, Alois Alzheimer.

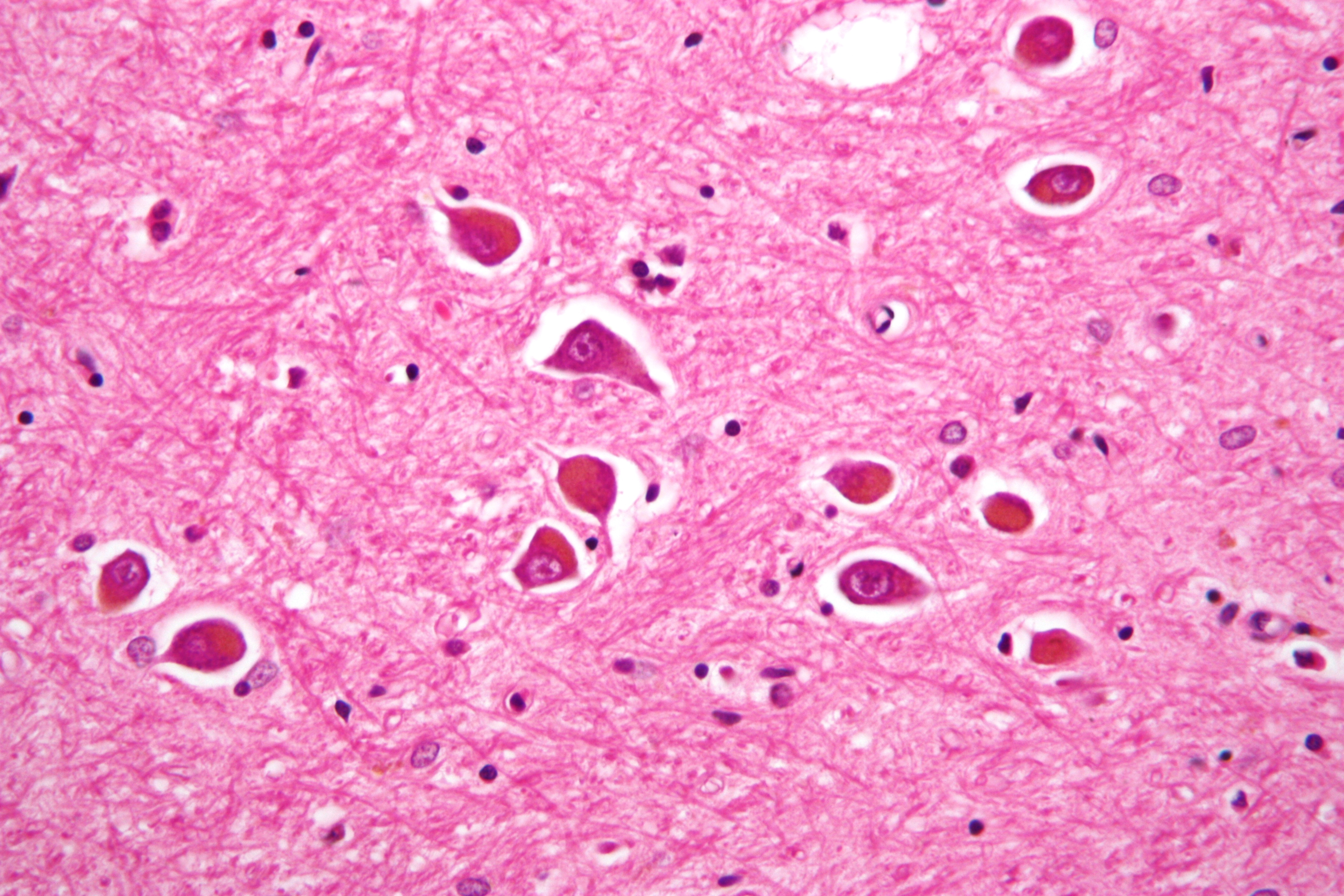
Magnified image of Alzheimer type II astrocyte. Note the enlarged nuclei of these astrocytes.

== Background ==
Astrocytes belong to a class of glial cells which are known to have specialized functions in the central nervous system. Among many biological roles, astrocytes are important for neuronal development, synaptic transmission, homeostasis, and neuroprotection. For example, astrocytes have many transporters and ion channels that allow for ion balance and static pH levels in order to achieve homeostasis. Although astrocytes are closely related to neurons and neuronal functions, they are not neuronal cells due to their inability to propagate action potentials. However, they are excitable cells that are able to influence synaptic transmission with cellular triggers such as calcium influx. Astrocytes can also respond to CNS injury by undergoing reactive gliosis. This acts as a neuroprotective event by upregulating intermediate filament proteins for structural cellular support. One of these proteins, glial fibrillary acidic protein (GFAP) can be used as a marker for reactive gliosis in damaged tissue.

== General characteristics ==
Alzheimer type II astrocytosis occurs when the astrocyte is swollen and exhibits a large nucleus along with a significant nucleolus. Alzheimer type II astrocytes are visually characterized by an enlarged size and lack of cytoplasm. These astrocytes appear to be metabolically hyperactive, and contain vesicular nuclei and basophilic nucleoli. They also contain thin marginal chromatin and excessive amounts of glycogen. Alzheimer type II astrocytes may be found in both cortical and subcortical areas, including the brain stem, cerebellum, cerebral cortex, and thalamus.

=== Characteristics of disease ===
When hyperammonemia occurs in hepatic encephalopathy, associated phenotypic changes in appearances occur in the cells as well as regulation of gene expression for proteins associated with regulation cell volume and transmission of neuronal impulses. In previous studies of hepatic encephalopathy, the presence of Alzheimer type II astrocytes corresponded to mitochondrial degeneration, as well as previously known phenotypic characteristics such as a prominent nucleolus and enlarged pale nuclei. Additionally, when these astrocytes are exposed to ammonia it causes gliopathy, the dysregulation and dysfunction of the astrocytes. This gliopathy is what is thought to cause encephalopathy in HE.

== Pathology ==
Alzheimer type II astrocytes are present in hepatic encephalopathy and Wilson's disease. The presence of Alzheimer type II astrocytes is a key indicator of hepatic encephalopathy, and may be induced by increased bodily ammonia. In hepatic encephalopathy, Alzheimer type II astrocytes are characterized by thin chromatin and increased glycogen levels. Although these astrocytes are present in this disease, it has not yet been determined if Alzheimer type II astrocytes are a pathological symptom for HE.

The origin of Alzheimer type II astrocytes is unclear, although they are known to arise from astroglial cells in the development of Wilson's disease. Experiments with mice have shown that exposure to manganese leads to the development of Alzheimer's type II astrocytes. This suggests that manganism, a neurological disorder with Parkinson's-like symptoms, is caused by the development of these astrocytes through manganese poisoning.

These cells are typically seen in conditions such as chronic liver disease, where hyperammonemia occurs. This is due to the presence of the enzyme glutamine synthetase, which is able to detoxify ammonia through the amidation of glutamate, producing glutamine in the process. Swelling occurs in these astrocytes due to the increased intracellular glutamine levels which induces osmotic stress on the cell and results in edema. This hypothesis is called the glutamine/osmolyte hypothesis, and has yet to be researched extensively. However, it is generally thought that ammonia-induced astrocyte swelling can be attributed to oxidative stress that glutamine can exert on the cell, as well as the creation of free radicals that may cause astrocytic damage. It is difficult for researchers to accept that excess intracellular glutamine produced in response to hyperammonemia is the direct cause of astrocytic cell swelling and therefore brain edema, however scientific data is beginning to support the effect that glutamine may have on other chemical reactions that occur in the brain such as the generation of free radicals. This area has not been fully researched yet, and more information about the mechanism by which glutamine creates radicals in the brain and the effect that this has on edema must be elucidated.
