= Interface hepatitis =

Pattern of hepatic cell death

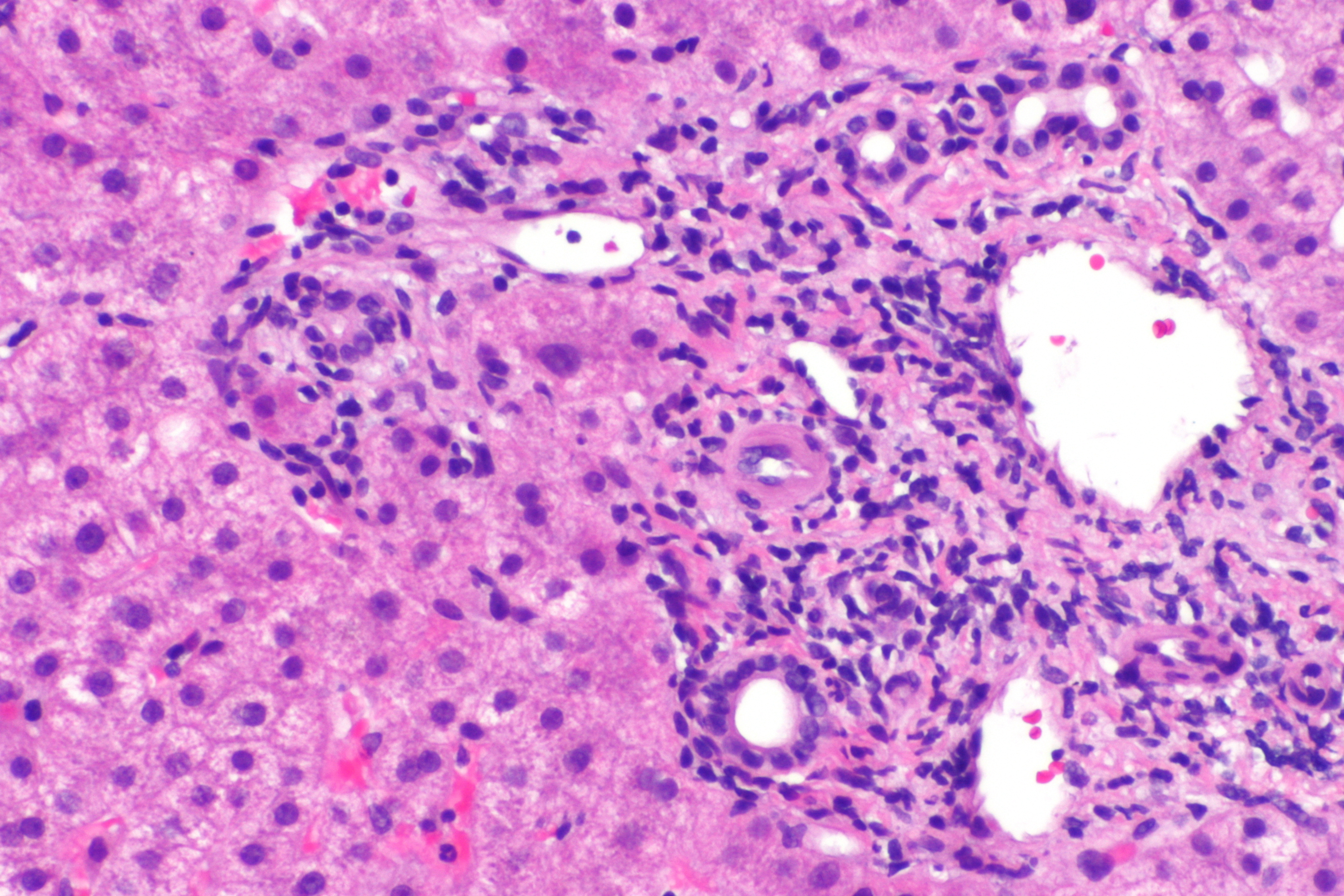
Microscopic image showing interface hepatitis in a liver biopsy

Interface hepatitis, formerly known as piecemeal necrosis, nibbling necrosis, and interface necrosis, describes the death of liver cells (hepatocytes) at the lobular-portal-interface, which occurs cell-by-cell (hence "piecemeal"), producing an irregular appearance. Since the underlying mechanism of liver cell death is apoptosis and not necrosis, the term "interface hepatitis" is considered less misleading.

Interface hepatitis is characterized by infiltration of lymphocytes into the adjacent parenchyma, and with destruction of individual hepatocytes along the edges of the portal tract. It has been found to occur in chronic hepatitis, particularly in the chronic forms of viral hepatitis, autoimmune hepatitis, and drug-induced liver injury.
