= Liver kidney microsomal type 1 antibody =

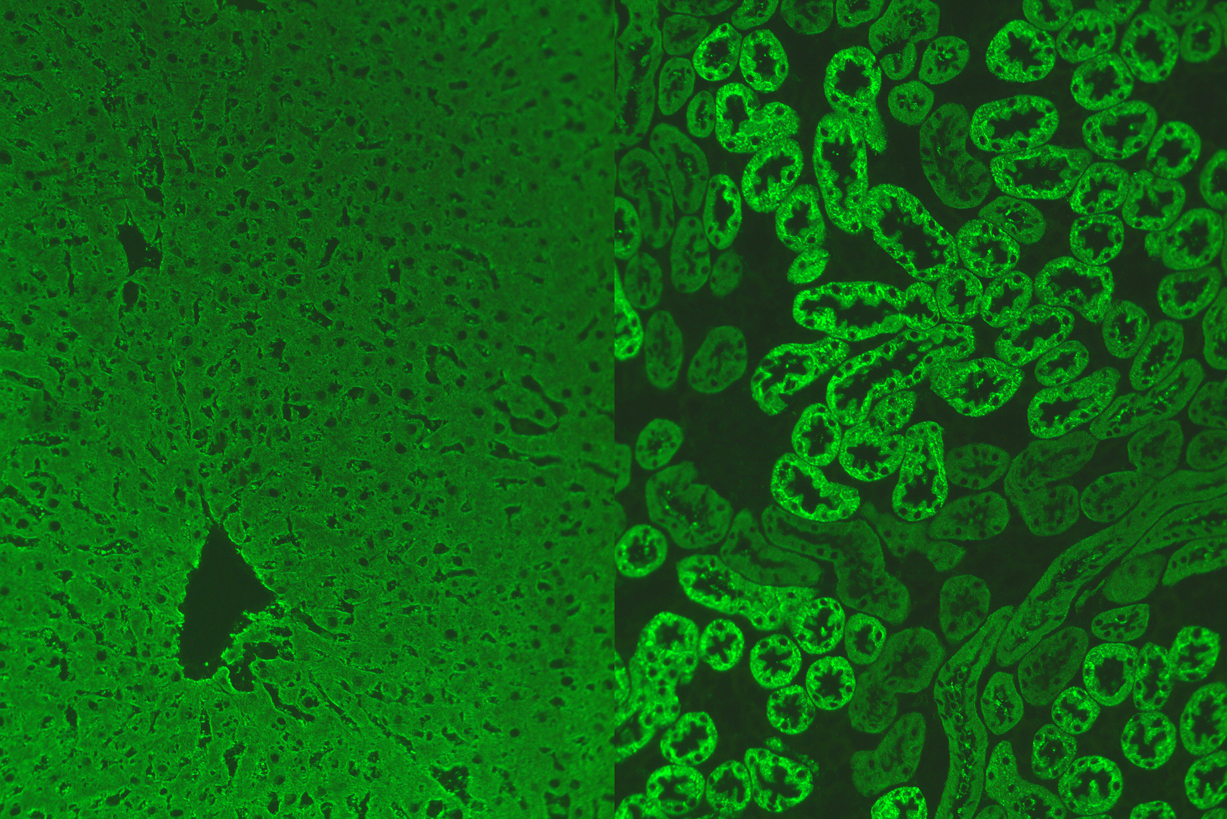
Immunofluorescence pattern of LKM1 antibodies on liver (left) and kidney (right). Staining of proximal tubules can be observerved on the kidney, whereas distal tubules remain unstained.

Liver kidney microsomal type 1 antibody (anti-LKM1) is an autoantibody associated with autoimmune hepatitis (AIH). Specifically, its presence in AIH defines type 2 AIH, although it has been proposed that anti-liver cytosol type 1 autoantibody without detectable anti-LKM1 can be seen in type 2 AIH. It is one of the several subtypes of anti–liver-kidney microsome antibodies that are known. The frequent association of anti-LKM-1 antibodies and hepatitis C virus (HCV) infections and the probable existence of an infection-associated autoimmune form of anti-LKM-1-associated hepatitis, requiring a different therapeutic strategy, necessitate the exact determination of anti-LKM-1 specificities.

== See also ==
- CYP2D6 – The target of anti-LKM-1
