= FibroTest =

- Purpose: assess degree of liver damage

FibroTest, known as FibroSure in the US, is a biomarker test that uses the results of six blood serum tests to generate a score that is correlated with the degree of liver damage in people with a variety of liver diseases. FibroTest has the same prognostic value as a liver biopsy. FibroSure uses quantitative results of five serum biochemical markers, α2-macroglobulin, haptoglobin, apolipoprotein A1, bilirubin, gamma glutamyl transpeptidase (GGT), with a patient's age and gender to generate a measure of fibrosis and necroinflammatory activity in the liver.

FibroTest has been evaluated in relation to liver biopsy (the current reference standard in liver disease assessment) in people with hepatitis C, hepatitis B, alcoholic liver disease, and non-alcoholic fatty liver disease. They are most useful for cirrhosis and less useful for other stages of liver disease.

By 2008 it had been used in over 350,000 patients. In 2006, the French National Authority for Health recommended the use of FibroTest as one of a number of first-line assessment tool for fibrosis with untreated chronic hepatitis C.

== Procedure ==
The FibroTest score is calculated from the results of a six-parameter blood test, combining six serum markers with the age and gender of the patient: Alpha-2-macroglobulin, Haptoglobin, Apolipoprotein A1, Gamma-glutamyl transpeptidase (GGT), Total bilirubin, and Alanine transaminase (ALT). ALT is used in a second assessment called ActiTest that is part of FibroTest.

The equation for calculating the FibroTest score regression coefficient (logistic regression) is:

$z=4.467\times \log_{10} [Alpha2M (g/L)]-1.357\times\log_{10} [Haptoglobulin (g/L)] + 1.017 \times \log_{10} [GGT (IU/L)] + 0.0281 \times [Age]$

$$+ 1.737 \times \log_{10} [BIL (\mu mol/L)] - 1.184 \times [Apoliprotein (g/L)] + 0.301 \times B-5.54$$

where B=1 for male and B=0 for female. The score (between 0 and 1) is then

$F=1/(1+e^{-z})$

Due to variability of components assays and analyzers, FibroTest assays can only be performed in validated laboratories. FibroTest cannot be used without algorithms that detects false positives and false negatives; the equation alone is not a diagnosis tool.

The laboratory or physician connects to the BioPredictive website for calculation of the test results and prints the results sheet, which is available immediately and is accompanied by an interpretation aid and precautions for use.

== Applicability ==
Over 95% of tests are interpretable and allow a diagnosis of fibrosis and liver activity. In less than 5% of cases, likely false positives or false negatives are highlighted. FibroTest has been validated for chronic hepatitis C, chronic hepatitis B, chronic hepatitis C or B with HIV co-infection, alcoholic liver diseases (steatosis and steatohepatitis), and non-alcoholic steatohepatitis (diabetes, overweight, hypertriglyceridemia, hypercholesterolemia, hypertension).

FibroTest is independent of ethnic origin, sex, genotype, viral load, transaminases or the presence of comorbidities. The test has been validated in those over the age of 65 years, children, people with chronic kidney disease or kidney transplantation, hemophiliacs, patients with chronic inflammatory disease, and the general population.

The tests are not applicable in 1 to 5% of cases. These cases can be detected by laboratory safety algorithms and when detected they are indicated on the results sheet:

- Acute hepatitides, e.g., acute viral hepatitis A, B, C, D, E; drug-induced hepatitis
- Extrahepatic cholestasis, e.g., pancreatic cancer, gallstones
- Severe hemolysis, e.g., some heart valves
- Gilbert's syndrome with high unconjugated hyperbilirubinemia
- Acute inflammatory syndrome (the blood test may be postponed)

== Interpretation ==
The FibroTest score (in this case 0.88) may indicate the presence of cirrhosis.

The conversion of FibroTest score into stages according to the three most used histological classifications (METAVIR, Knodell and Ishak) for liver biopsies is:

FibroTest	METAVIR	Knodell	Ishak
0.75-1.00	F4	F4	F6
0.73-0.74	F3-F4	F3-F4	F5
0.59-0.72	F3	F3	F4
0.49-0.58	F2	F1-F3	F3
0.32-0.48	F1-F2	F1-F3	F2-F3
0.28-0.31	F1	F1	F2
0.22-0.27	F0-F1	F0-F1	F1
0.00-0.21	F0	F0	F0

== Comparison with liver biopsy ==
Liver biopsy is an imperfect tool; due to sampling errors, biopsy size (5 to 30 mm) and intra- and interobservor variability, it is now agreed that biopsy is an "imperfect Gold Standard " (citation required). Biopsy continues to present inconveniences: 30% of patients complain of pain, up to 3% have been noted to have complications severe enough to require hospitalization and a 0.01-0.3% rate of deaths has been reported. There is a mean discordance of 25% between FibroTest and biopsy. Half of these discordances are attributable to an error of the biopsy, often too small, and the other half to FibroTest. The inventors report that FibroTest has comparable diagnostic and prognostic value as a 25 mm biopsy, while being noninvasive and easily repeatable.
