= King's College Criteria =

Assessment of acute liver failure

The King's College Criteria or the King's College Hospital criteria were devised in 1989 to determine if there were any early indices of poor prognosis in patients with acute liver failure. Acute liver failure is defined as the onset of encephalopathy (altered mental status) or coagulopathy (altered bleeding tendencies) within 26 weeks of a patient diagnosed with liver disease. Patients with hepatitis B acquired at birth, Wilson's disease and autoimmune hepatitis are included if their disease was identified within the past 26 weeks. These patients are very ill, and have a very high risk of dying of their illness without adequate treatment which may include liver transplantation. It is important that physicians find ways of identifying patients with acute liver failure early in their course who will do poorly, and may require liver transplantation. The King's College Criteria have consistently shown excellent operating characteristics for determining prognosis in these patients. As liver transplantation becomes a more accessible option for patients with acute liver failure, the King's College Criteria serve a role in determining which patients may require transplantation.

== Criteria ==
The King's College criteria were described in a seminal publication in 1989 by J.G. O'Grady and colleagues from King's College School of Medicine. 588 patients with acute liver failure who presented to King's College Hospital from 1973 to 1985 were assessed retrospectively to determine if there were particular clinical features or tests that correlated poorly with prognosis. The criteria were stratified into acetaminophen and non-acetaminophen causes of acute liver failure, due to the different operating characteristics of parameters correlating with prognosis in the two causes.

=== Paracetamol induced acute liver failure ===
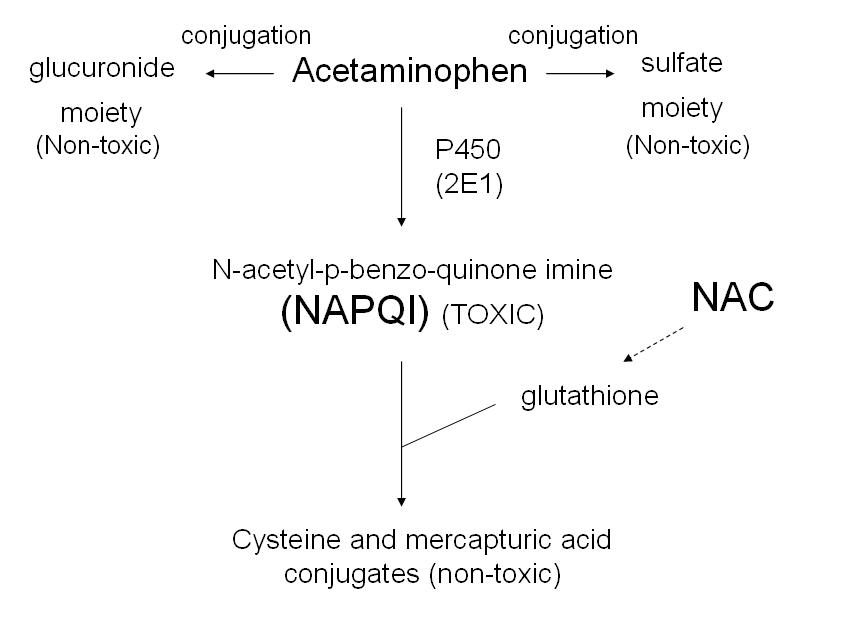
Schematic of the metabolism of acetaminophen (paracetamol) by the hepatocyte.

Acetaminophen (or paracetamol) is an analgesic medication that can affect the liver when administered in high doses. Acetaminophen is predominantly conjugated into glucuronate and sulfate moieties by Phase II metabolism. A small percentage is metabolized by the cytochrome P450 pathway to a toxic metabolite, NAPQI. NAPQI is conjugated by glutathione to non-toxic cysteine and mercapturic acid moieties. In cases of acetaminophen toxicity, the Phase II conjugation enzymes are saturated, and a higher fraction is converted to NAPQI. The conjugation of NAPQI to glutathione occurs until glutathione is depleted from hepatic reserves, after which the toxic NAPQI accumulates and causes damage to the hepatocytes. This occurs primarily in areas of the liver that are relatively poorly perfused with oxygen, or furthest away from the hepatic artery, termed Zone 3. Acetaminophen overdose is associated with Zone 3 necrosis, to the point that acute liver failure may result.

The King's College Criteria identify two groups of patients that have a poor prognosis with acetaminophen induced liver failure:

- Arterial pH < 7.3 (taken by sampling of blood from an artery); or,
- All three of an international normalized ratio (INR) of greater than 6.5, serum creatinine of greater than 300 micromoles per litre and the presence of encephalopathy (of grade III or IV). These three are markers of coagulopathy, kidney function and mental status.

=== Non-paracetamol acute liver failure ===
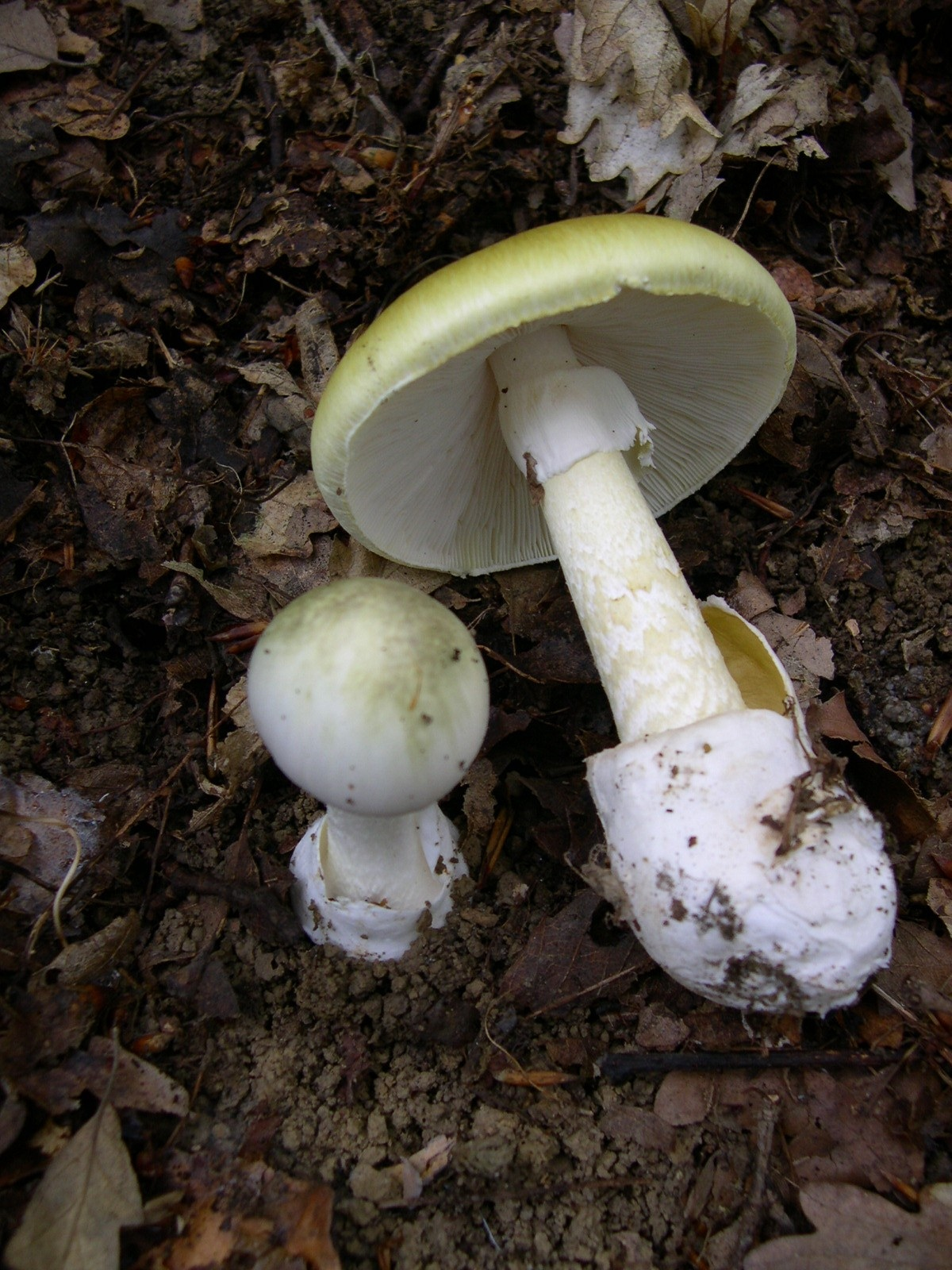
Amanita phalloides, the death cap mushroom, is a cause of acute liver failure

There are many causes of acute liver failure aside from acetaminophen toxicity; these include viral hepatitis—including hepatitis A (rarely), hepatitis B, hepatitis C (rarely), hepatitis E (especially in pregnant women), Epstein–Barr virus, cytomegalovirus and varicella zoster virus -- Wilson's disease, the toxin of the death cap mushroom (Amanita phalloides), alcohol, autoimmune hepatitis, Budd–Chiari syndrome, other medications (including halothane, hormonal contraception, and isoniazid), recreational drugs (including ecstasy ) and, rarely, tumours infiltrating the liver.

In patients with non-acetaminophen acute liver failure, the following criteria were identified as being associated with a poor prognosis:

- INR greater than 6.5; or,
- Three of the following five criteria:
  - Patient age of less than 11 or greater than 40;
  - Serum bilirubin of greater than 300 micromoles per litre;
  - Time from onset of jaundice to the development of coma of greater than seven days;
  - INR greater than 3.5; or,
  - Drug toxicity, regardless of whether it was the cause of the acute liver failure.

== Utility in prediction ==
The utility of the criteria in determining the prognosis of patients with acute liver failure is defined by their operating characteristics. The positive predictive value of the criteria in predicting death from acute liver failure has ranged from 70% to 100%. A Canadian meta-analysis assessing various prognostic indices found that the specificity of the King's College criteria in predicting mortality exceeded 90%, with a sensitivity of 69%. As a result, the American Society for Study of Liver Diseases has recommended the King's College Criteria as being helpful early parameters in ascertaining the need for liver transplantation in patients with acute liver failure.

== Alternatives ==
A variety of other calculations have been done based on similar parameters to determine the risk of mortality in acute liver failure. The Acute Physiology and Chronic Health Evaluation II (APACHE II) score has a comparable sensitivity to the King's College Criteria in determining prognosis.
