= Hyperdynamic circulation =

Abnormally increased circulatory volume

Hyperdynamic circulation is abnormally increased circulatory volume. Systemic vasodilation and the associated decrease in peripheral vascular resistance results in decreased pulmonary capillary wedge pressure and decreased blood pressure, presenting usually with a collapsing pulse, but sometimes a bounding pulse. In effort to compensate the heart will increase cardiac output and heart rate, which accounts for the increased pulse pressure and sinus tachycardia. Hyperdynamic circulation is a hallmark of distributive shock (such as sepsis) and physiological states like normal pregnancy. It is also a defining feature of high-output cardiac states, which include severe anemia, hyperthyroidism, liver cirrhosis, and large arteriovenous malformations.

== Possible causes ==
- Kidney disease
- Hypovolemia
- Adrenal crisis - especially after fluid replacement
- Anemia
- Anxiety
- Aortic Regurgitation
- AV fistulae
- Beriberi
- Dysautonomia
- Erythroderma
- Exercise
- Liver failure
- Hydrocephalus
- Hypercapnia
- Paget's disease
- Portal hypertension
- Pregnancy
- Pyrexia
- Thyrotoxicosis
- Vasodilator drugs
