= Anti-LKM antibody =

An anti-LKM antibody (anti–liver-kidney microsomal antibody or LKM antibody) is any of several autoantibodies that are detected in the serum of patients with different types of acute or chronic liver disease. These antibodies are targeted against antigens of the cytochrome P450 system.

There are three different types of anti-LKM antibodies, LKM-1, LKM-2, and LKM-3. Each of which are differentiated from each other by unique immunofluorescent staining patterns. LKM antibodies are only found in patients that have autoimmune chronic active hepatitis and drug induced hepatitis.

LKM antibodies are usually found in middle aged males of mediterranean extraction, however occasionally they can be found in adult patients who have no liver disease.

Anti-LKM antibodies are significant as their presence helps doctors diagnose and differentiate between autoimmune and drug induced liver conditions. Most often, these antibodies are found in patients that have autoimmune hepatitis type 2 (AIH-2), which is a rare form of an autoimmune liver disease that primarily affects children and young adults, but could also appear in adults. When anti-LKM antibodies are detected during testing they are strongly associated with AIH-2, making them a key part in the diagnosis process. These antibodies are less commonly found in hepatitis C infections, and when they are can complicate the diagnosis and make it difficult for treatment planning.

Doctors typically use indirect immunofluorescence on tissue sections to detect the presence and patterns of LKM antibodies. The staining pattern helps identify which type of anti-LKM is present, such as LKM-1, LKM-2, LKM-3.

Although the cause of why these autoantibodies develop isn't fully understood, researchers think it may involve a mix of genetics susceptibility and environmental triggers. Some studies suggest that certain viral infections might trigger the immune system in genetically predisposed individuals to produce LKM antibodies. In autoimmune hepatitis the immune system mistakenly recognizes liver cells as foreign, attacking them and leading to inflammation and liver damage.

The main targets of the LKM antibodies are enzymes in the cytochrome P450 system. This system is important for breaking down many substances in the liver, including drugs and toxins. When the immune system targets these enzymes, it can interfere with liver function and cause buildup of harmful substances in the body. If there is drug induced hepatitis, drugs like tienilic acid can bind to liver proteins and create an antigen that the immune system sees as foreign. This then triggers the production of anti-LKM-2 antibodies.

Anti-LKM-3 antibodies have been found in patients who have autoimmune polyendocrine syndrome type 1, a rare condition where multiple endocrine glands are attacked by the immune system. These antibodies are usually linked to chronic active hepatitis in these patients, and their detection can help identify and monitor autoimmune activity beyond just the liver.

Although anti-LKM antibodies are typically a marker for liver disease, they have every so often been reported in individuals who do not show any signs of liver damage. However, in these cases the medical relevance isn't yet clear. It is a possibility that the antibodies are a sign of a very early stage of autoimmune activity.

The treatment for autoimmune hepatitis usually involves immunosuppressive medications. These drugs help reduce the immune system's attack on the liver. When anti-LKM antibodies are present, treatment responses may vary. Patients with AIH-2 often need more aggressive or longer treatment compared to those with type 1. Regular monitoring is necessary for tracking diseases such as this one.

== Classification ==
There are three kinds of anti-LKM antibodies:

Microsomal antibody	Antigen	Disease
anti-LKM 1	cytochrome P450 2D6	autoimmune hepatitis type II and chronic hepatitis C (10%)
anti-LKM 2	cytochrome P450 2C9	drug-induced hepatitis (tienilic acid–induced)
anti-LKM 3	cytochrome P450 1A2	chronic active hepatitis in association with autoimmune polyendocrine syndrome type 1; hepatitis D
