= Anti-smooth muscle antibody =

Class of autoantibody

Anti-smooth muscle antibodies are antibodies (immunoglobulins) formed against smooth muscle. These antibodies are typically associated with autoimmune hepatitis.

These antibodies can be directed against actin, troponin, and tropomyosin.
