= Liver biopsy =

Medical test involving removal of tissue sample from the liver

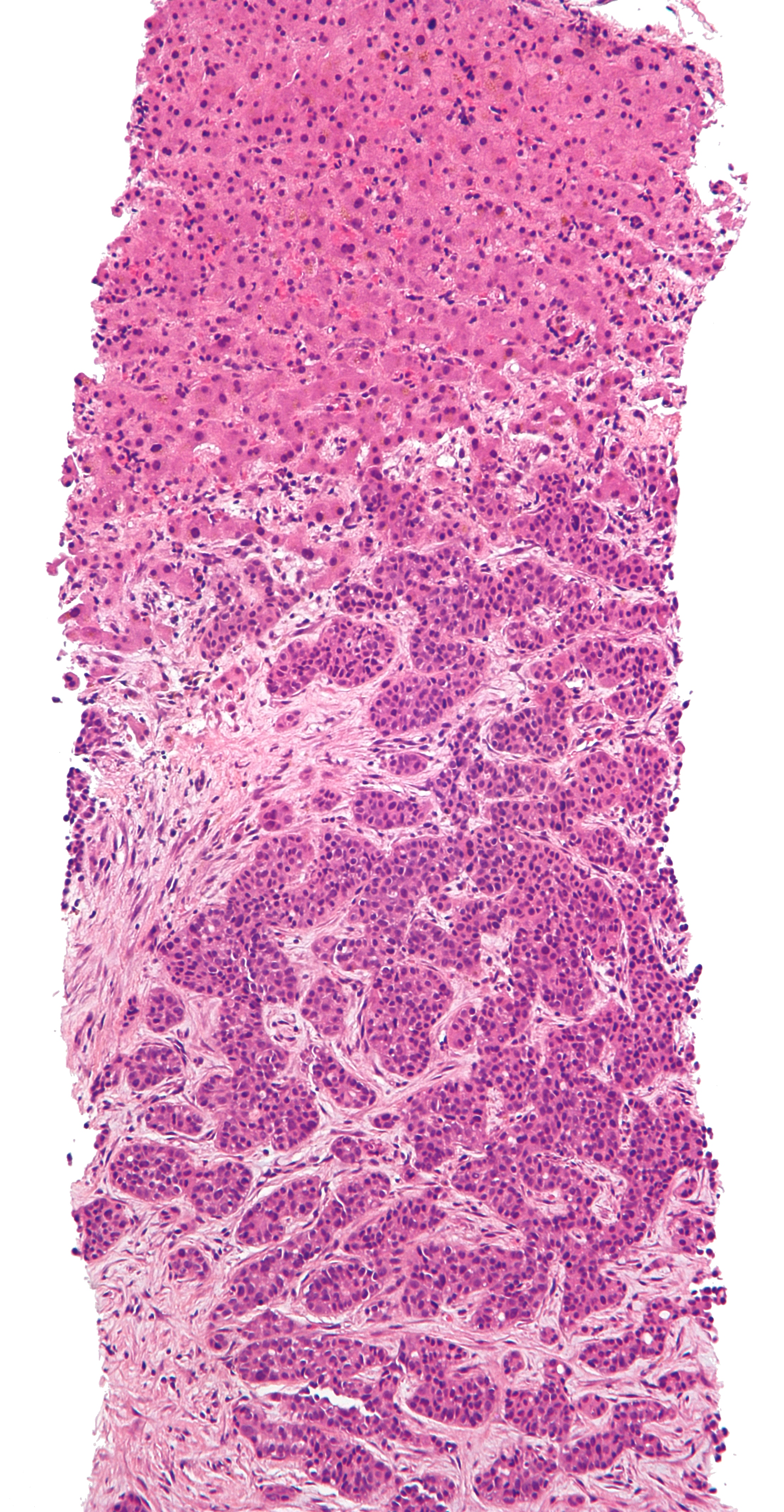
- Micrograph of a liver core needle biopsy showing cancer.
- ICD-9-CM: 50.1
- MedlinePlus: 003895

Liver biopsy is the biopsy (removal of a small sample of tissue) from the liver. It is a medical test that is done to aid diagnosis of liver disease, to assess the severity of known liver disease, and to monitor the progress of treatment.

== Medical uses ==
Liver biopsy is often required for the diagnosis of a liver problem (jaundice, abnormal blood tests) where blood tests, such as hepatitis A serology, have not been able to identify a cause. It is also required if hepatitis is possibly the result of medication, but the exact nature of the reaction is unclear. Alcoholic liver disease and tuberculosis of the liver may be diagnosed through biopsy. Direct biopsy of tumors of the liver may aid the diagnosis, although this may be avoided if the source is clear (e.g. spread from previously known colorectal cancer). Liver biopsy will likely remain particularly important in the diagnosis of unexplained liver disease. Non-invasive tests for liver fibrosis in alcoholic, nonalcoholic and viral liver diseases are likely to become more widely used.

If the diagnosis is already clear, such as chronic hepatitis B or hepatitis C, liver biopsy is useful to assess the severity of the associated liver damage. The same is true for haemochromatosis (iron overload), although it is frequently omitted. Primary biliary cirrhosis and primary sclerosing cholangitis may require biopsy, although other diagnostic modalities have made this less necessary.

Occasionally, liver biopsy is required to monitor the progress of treatment, such as in chronic viral hepatitis. It is an effective way to measure changes in the Ishak fibrosis score.

For decades, liver biopsy has been considered the gold standard for assessing the stage of fibrosis and the grade of necroinflammatory activity in chronic liver disease. Historically, major consensus conference statements recommended a liver biopsy in the clinical management of almost all patients with chronic hepatitis B and C to guide treatment decisions and predict prognosis.

Biopsy results show significant variability (up to 40% for fibrosis diagnosis) which can lead to a wrong diagnosis. The result depends on the representativity of the punctured sample.

Only 5% of patients at risk of fibrosis have liver biopsy. In 2002, the consensus conferences in France and in the USA raised the possibility of treating patients with chronic hepatitis without liver biopsy. These conferences also underlined the necessity of developing reliable non-invasive tests that might be an alternative to liver biopsy both in hepatitis B and C.

== Risks and limitations ==
Liver biopsy is generally a safe procedure, but it is invasive. Complications of liver biopsy are rare but potentially lethal. The majority of complications (60%) occur within two hours, and 96% occur within 24 hours following the procedure. Approximately 2–3% of patients undergoing liver biopsy require hospitalization for the management of an adverse event. Thirty percent of patients experience significant pain during the procedure.

Significant bleeding after a liver biopsy occurs in 1–2 out of 100 patients who are biopsied. Bleeding usually becomes apparent within three to four hours. It often stops on its own, but if it persists, a blood transfusion may be needed. Surgery or angiography (a procedure in which the bleeding site is identified and treated) may be required if the bleeding is severe or does not stop on its own. Intraperitoneal hemorrhage is the most serious consequence of bleeding. Fatal complications have been reported in up to 0.01–0.3% of biopsied patients.

== Procedure and variants ==
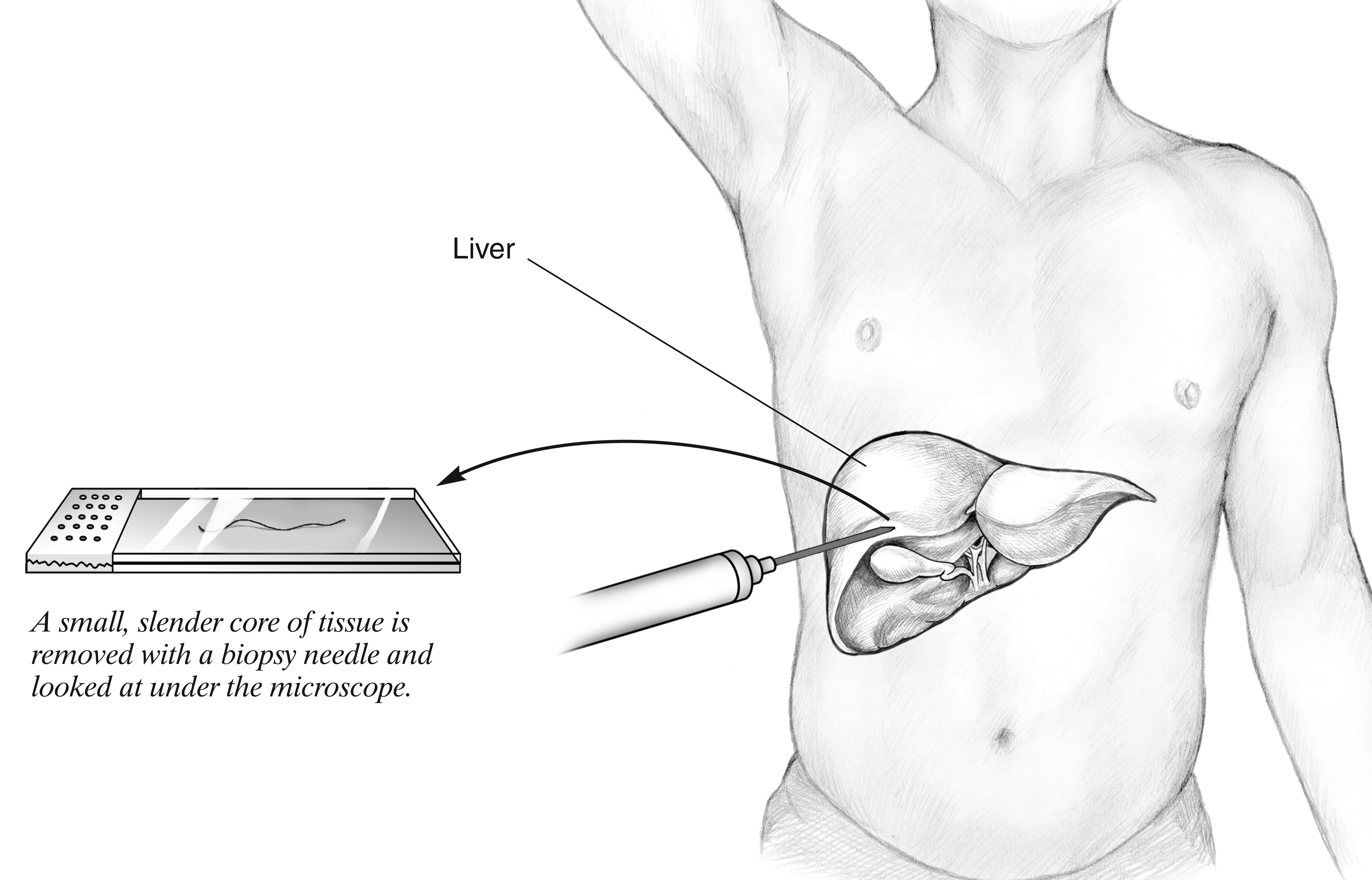
A small quantity of tissue is sampled from the liver when doing a biopsy, which is then examined under a microscope

Liver biopsies may be taken percutaneously (via a needle through the skin), transvenously (through the blood vessels), endoscopically (through endoscopic ultrasound fine needle biopsy), or directly during abdominal surgery. The sample is examined by microscope, and may be processed further by immunohistochemistry, determination of iron and copper content, and microbiological culture if tuberculosis is suspected

For a percutaneous biopsy, it is recommended to use a Birmingham gauge 16 or wider cutting needle, and obtaining a length of 20–25 mm of liver tissue. The presence of 10–12 portal tracts within the specimen is considered sufficient for reliable analysis, ensuring that architectural relationships between structures are maintained.

Liver biopsy results are limited by sampling error, as abnormal findings may be missed if only normal tissue is retrieved. In addition, interpretation of liver biopsy results may vary.

== History ==
The first liver aspirate was performed by the German physician Paul Ehrlich in 1883. In 1923, the first report of percutaneous liver biopsy was described. The transjugular approach was pioneered by radiologist Charles Dotter in the 1970s.

== Non-invasive alternatives ==
Non-invasive alternatives to liver biopsy in hepatitis C patients include both functional staging (quantitative liver function tests) and determination of fibrosis from non-invasive tests. These latter tests are described below and share the disadvantage of estimating fibrosis rather than function. Functional staging has the advantage of evaluating the whole liver and directly measuring hepatic function that determines many clinical outcomes. The ability to predict clinical outcomes is the best proof of the value of a clinical test. Quantitative hepatic function tests were better than combinations of routine blood tests and Ishak fibrosis score in predicting clinical outcomes. The best of these were the perfused hepatic mass (PHM) by quantitative laparoscopic liver spleen scan (QLSS) and oral Cholate clearance and shunt, a blood test. The QLSS measurement of spleen volume per ideal body weight was nearly as good.

Multiphasic MRI is useful in diagnosing various types of liver lesions such as hepatocellular carcinoma, cholangiocarcinoma, hepatocellular adenoma, focal nodular hyperplasia, and hemangioma.

FibroTest (FibroSure in the USA) and FibroMax are non-invasive tests using a blood sample and an algorithm. The test results correspond to stages F0-F4 and grades A0-A3 of the METAVIR scoring system. In 2007 FibroTest was validated by French Health Authorities as a first-line diagnosis of liver injury before biopsy. It was recommended to be a better predictor than biopsy staging for hepatitis C complications and death.

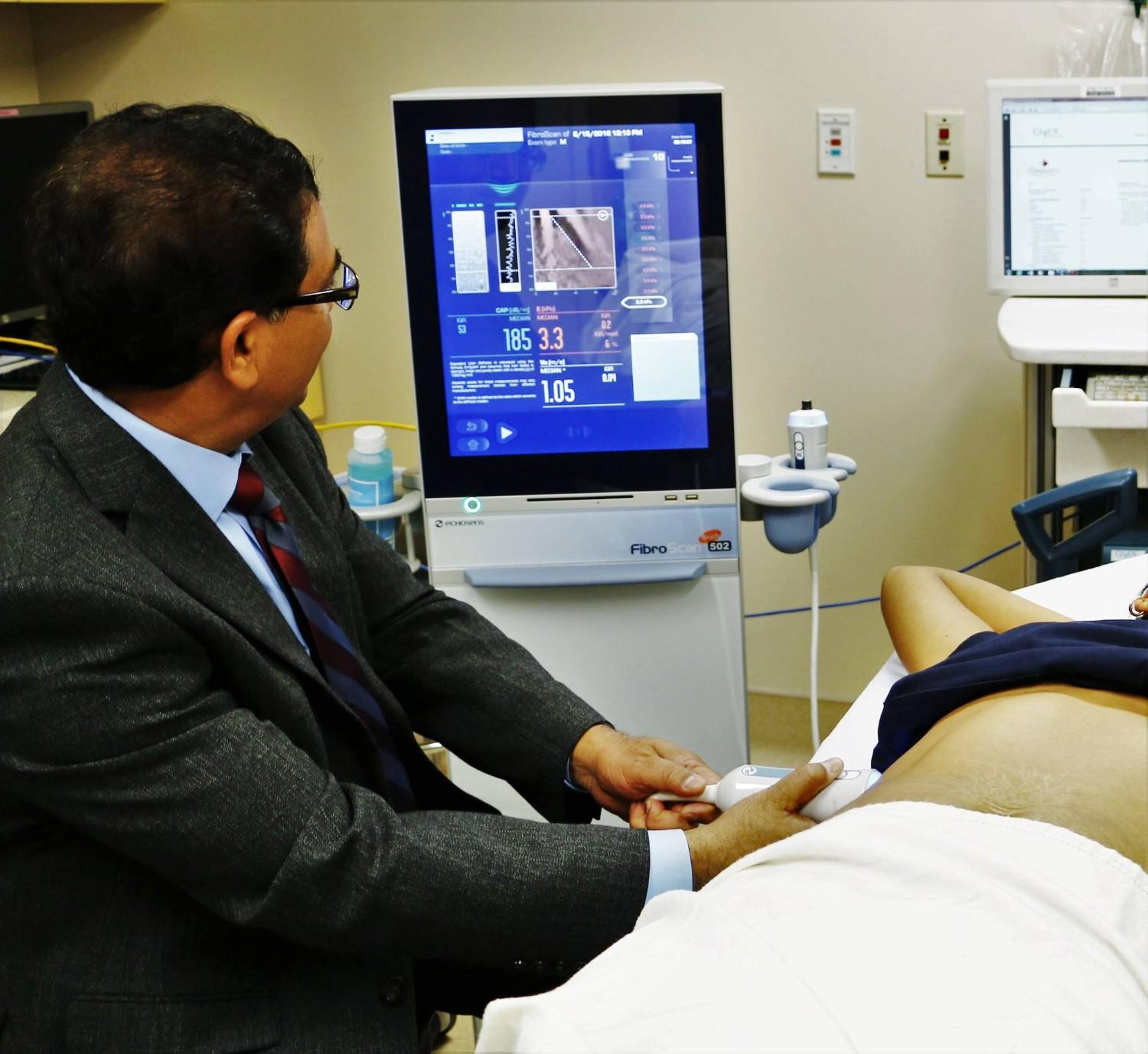
A clinical Transient Elastography (FibroScan) report. This non-invasive method measures Liver Stiffness (LSM) to stage fibrosis and the Controlled Attenuation Parameter (CAP) to measure fat accumulation, serving as a widely used alternative to an invasive liver biopsy.

FibroScan is a type of ultrasound machine that uses transient elastography to measure liver stiffness. Its diagnostic performance for fibrosis is similar to that of methods based on serologic markers. Combined use of Fibroscan and Fibrotest could avoid a liver biopsy in most patients with chronic hepatitis C. Other ultrasonic techniques used to characterize liver stiffness include Acoustic Radiation Force Impulse (ARFI) Imaging.

"Hepascore" is a blood test developed in Australia combining the following clinical and laboratory variables: age, gender, bilirubin, GGT, hyaluronic acid, alpha 2 macroglobin to create a score. The test has been validated for patients with hepatitis B, hepatitis C and non-alcoholic fatty liver disease.

The APRI (AST to platelet ratio index) is a quick serum biomarker for fibrosis assessment. This simple index is made up of routine laboratory tests. Although widely validated and recommended by global health authorities, including the World Health Organization (WHO), for resource-limited settings, a limitation of the test is that a substantial portion of patient results fall into an unclassifiable intermediate zone. Nevertheless, APRI remains highly useful for ruling out or excluding significant fibrosis in chronic hepatitis C virus infections.
