= Florence Wong =

Canadian scientist and physician

Professor Florence Wong FRCPC
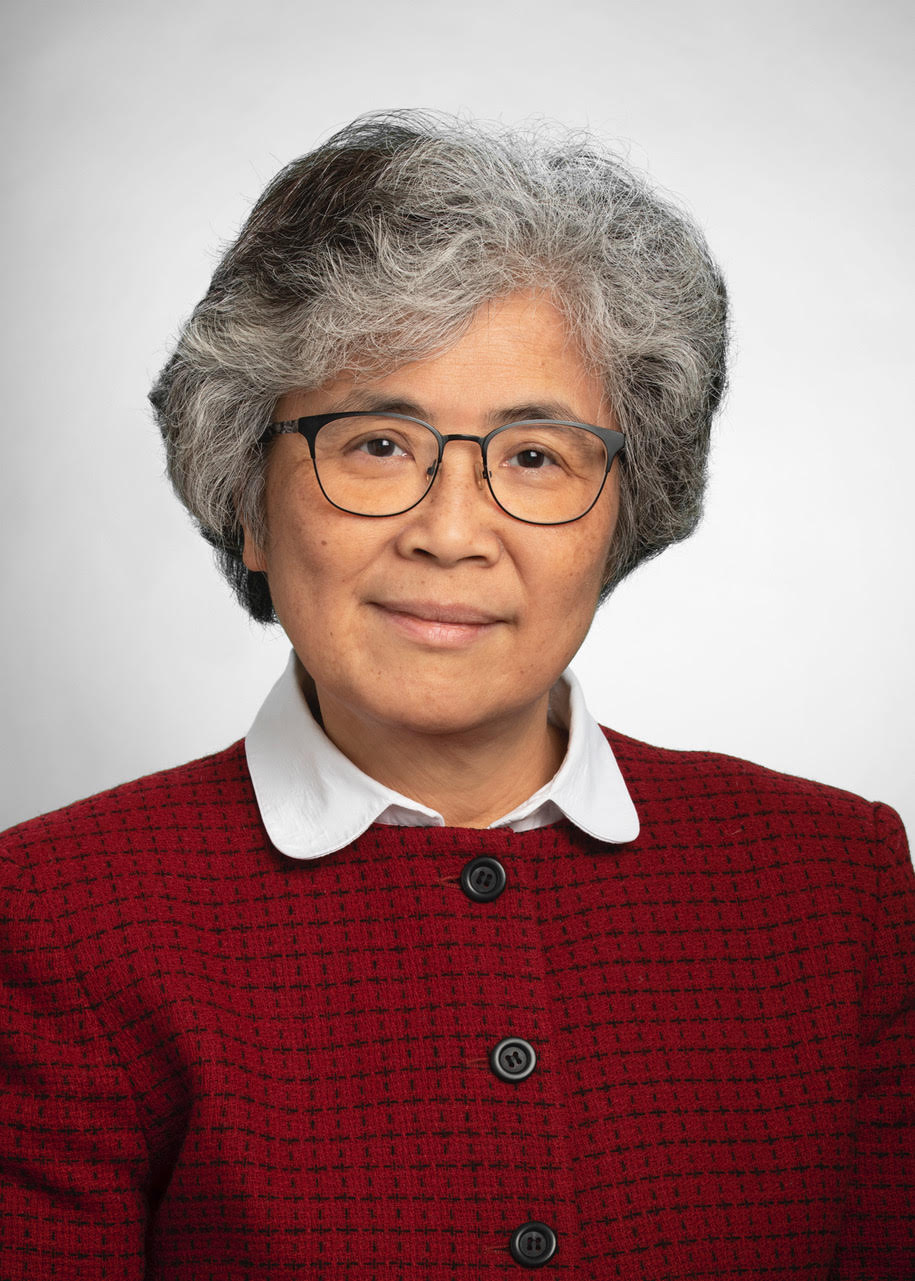
- Born: Florence Suet-Hing Wong
- Education: University of Melbourne
- Known for: hepatology; portal hypertension; cirrhosis
- Scientific career
- Fields: Medicine; Hepatology
- Workplaces: University of Toronto; University Health Network

Florence Wong is a Canadian hepatologist and scientist best known for her research into the development and management of complications of cirrhosis. She is a professor of gastroenterology at the University of Toronto and a physician in the Division of Gastroenterology and Hepatology at the University Health Network.

== Biography ==
Wong completed her medical degree at the University of Melbourne, and followed this with postgraduate training in hepatology in Australia and in Toronto.

Her research work is in the areas of portal hypertension, development of ascites, hepatorenal syndrome and kidney injury in cirrhosis. Most notably she has demonstrated the effectiveness of terlipressin and albumin in the treatment of type 1 hepatorenal syndrome.

She has been the Secretary of the International Ascites Club and received the Gold Medal from the Canadian Liver Foundation and the Canadian Association for the Study of the Liver.
