= Hepatorenal syndrome =

Human disease

- Classification and external resources
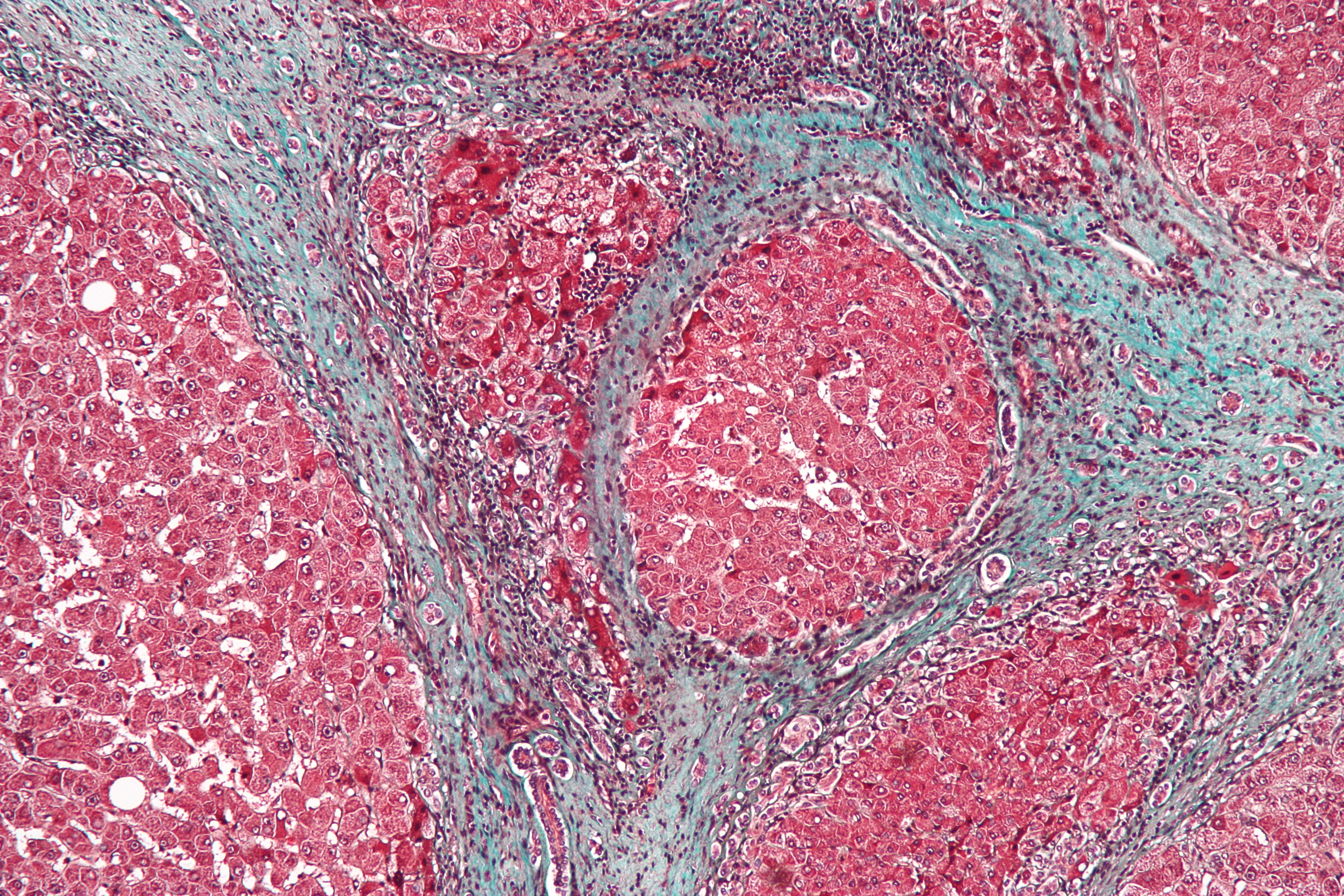
- Liver histology is altered in HRS while kidney histology is normal. The upper image is a trichrome stain (chicken wire appearance) cirrhosis of the liver, the most common cause of HRS. The lower image is a PAS stain of normal kidney histology.

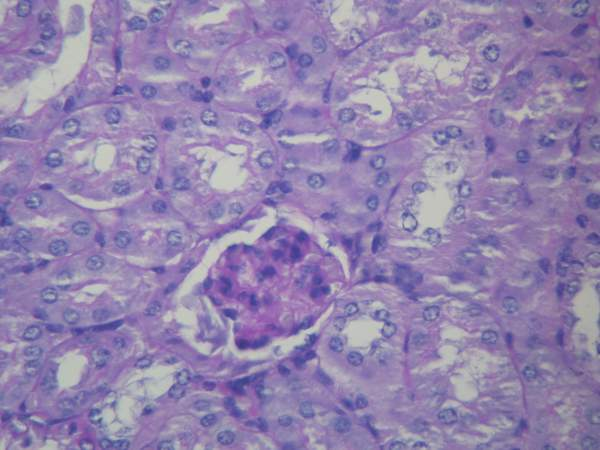
- ICD-10: K76.7
- ICD-9: 572.4
- DiseasesDB: 5810
- MedlinePlus
- eMedicine: med/1001 article/907429
- MeSH: D006530

Hepatorenal syndrome (HRS) is a life-threatening medical condition that consists of rapid deterioration in kidney function in individuals with cirrhosis or fulminant liver failure. HRS is usually fatal unless a liver transplant is performed, although various treatments, such as dialysis, can prevent advancement of the condition.

HRS can affect individuals with cirrhosis, severe alcoholic hepatitis, or liver failure, and usually occurs when liver function deteriorates rapidly because of a sudden insult such as an infection, bleeding in the gastrointestinal tract, or overuse of diuretic medications. HRS is a relatively common complication of cirrhosis, occurring in 18% of people within one year of their diagnosis, and in 39% within five years of their diagnosis. Deteriorating liver function is believed to cause changes in the circulation that supplies the intestines, altering blood flow and blood vessel tone in the kidneys. The kidney failure of HRS is a consequence of these changes in blood flow, rather than direct damage to the kidney. The diagnosis of hepatorenal syndrome is based on laboratory tests of individuals susceptible to the condition. Two forms of hepatorenal syndrome have been defined: Type 1 HRS entails a rapidly progressive decline in kidney function, while type 2 HRS is associated with ascites (fluid accumulation in the abdomen) that does not improve with standard diuretic medications.

The risk of death in hepatorenal syndrome is very high; the mortality of individuals with type 1 HRS is over 50% over the short term, as determined by historical case series. The only long-term treatment option for the condition is liver transplantation. While awaiting transplantation, people with HRS often receive other treatments that improve the abnormalities in blood vessel tone, including supportive care with medications, or the insertion of a transjugular intrahepatic portosystemic shunt (TIPS), which is a small shunt placed to reduce blood pressure in the portal vein. Some patients may require hemodialysis to support kidney function, or a newer technique called liver dialysis which uses a dialysis circuit with albumin-bound membranes to bind and remove toxins normally cleared by the liver, providing a means of extracorporeal liver support until transplantation can be performed.

== Classification ==
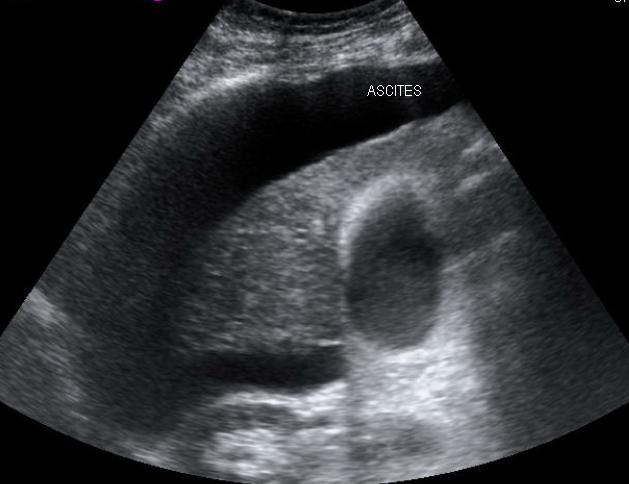
The development of ascites (as shown on this abdominal ultrasound) in cirrhotics that is refractory to the use of diuretic medications is associated with type 2 HRS.

Hepatorenal syndrome is a particular and common type of kidney failure that affects individuals with liver cirrhosis or, less commonly, with fulminant liver failure. The syndrome involves constriction of the blood vessels of the kidneys and dilation of blood vessels in the splanchnic circulation, which supplies the intestines. The classification of hepatorenal syndrome identifies two categories of kidney failure, termed type 1 and type 2 HRS, which both occur in individuals with either cirrhosis or fulminant liver failure. In both categories, the deterioration in kidney function is quantified either by an elevation in creatinine level in the blood, or by decreased clearance of creatinine in the urine.

=== Type 1 hepatorenal syndrome ===
Type 1 HRS is characterized by rapidly progressive kidney failure, with a doubling of serum creatinine to a level greater than 221 μmol/L (2.5 mg/dL) or a halving of the creatinine clearance to less than 20 mL/min over a period of less than two weeks. The prognosis of individuals with type 1 HRS is particularly grim, with a mortality rate exceeding 50% after one month. Patients with type 1 HRS are usually ill, may have low blood pressure, and may require therapy with drugs to improve the strength of heart muscle contraction (inotropes) or other drugs to maintain blood pressure (vasopressors). Unlike type II, in type I hepatorenal syndrome the kidney failure improves with treatment and stabilizes. Vasoconstrictors and volume expanders are the mainstay of treatment.

In 2015, the International Club of Ascites updated their definition of HRS Type 1 in light of recent studies. Termed HRS-AKI, no minimum creatinine value is needed, that is, HRS-AKI can be diagnosed even when the serum creatinine is below 2.5mg/dl (221umol/L).

Requirement for HRS-AKI are:

1. Increase in serum creatinine >0.3mg/L 26umol/L within 48 hrs OR increase by >1.5 times from baseline (reading from the last 3 months)
2. No response to withdrawal of diuretics or administration of 1g/kg of albumin 20% over the last 2 days
3. Cirrhosis with ascites
4. Absence of
  1. Shock state
  2. Current or recent use of nephrotoxins (e.g. NSAIDS, contrast dyes
  3. Signs of structural kidney disease
    1. proteinuria
    2. haematuria
    3. Abnormal findings on renal US

=== Type 2 hepatorenal syndrome ===
In contrast, type 2 HRS is slower in onset and progression, and is not associated with an inciting event. It is defined by an increase in serum creatinine level to >133 μmol/L (1.5 mg/dL) or a creatinine clearance of less than 40 mL/min, and a urine sodium < 10 μmol/L. It also carries a poor outlook, with a median survival of approximately six months unless the affected individual undergoes liver transplantation. Type 2 HRS is thought to be part of a spectrum of illness associated with increased pressures in the portal vein circulation, which begins with the development of fluid in the abdomen (ascites). The spectrum continues with diuretic-resistant ascites, where the kidneys are unable to excrete sufficient sodium to clear the fluid even with the use of diuretic medications. Most individuals with type 2 HRS have diuretic-resistant ascites before they develop deterioration in kidney function.

Similarly to the updated HRS-AKI, functional kidney injury in patients with cirrhosis that does not meet the criteria for HRS-AKI is termed HRS-NAKI. It can be divided into two groups, HRS-AKD, defined by eGFR <60ml/min/1.72 for less than 3 months, and HRS-CKD, defined by eGFR <60ml/min/1.72 for more than 3 months.

== Signs and symptoms ==
Both types of hepatorenal syndrome share three major components: altered liver function, abnormalities in circulation, and death. As these phenomena may not necessarily produce symptoms until late in their course, individuals with hepatorenal syndrome are typically diagnosed with the condition on the basis of altered laboratory tests. Most people who develop HRS have cirrhosis, and may have signs and symptoms of the same, which can include jaundice, altered mental status, evidence of decreased nutrition, and the presence of ascites. Specifically, the production of ascites that is resistant to the use of diuretic medications is characteristic of type 2 HRS. Oliguria, which is a decrease in urine volume, may occur as a consequence of kidney failure; however, some individuals with HRS continue to produce a normal amount of urine. As these signs and symptoms may not necessarily occur in HRS, they are not included in the major and minor criteria for making a diagnosis of this condition; instead HRS is diagnosed in an individual at risk for the condition on the basis of the results of laboratory tests, and the exclusion of other causes.

== Causes ==
Hepatorenal syndrome usually affects individuals with cirrhosis and elevated pressures in the portal vein system (termed portal hypertension). While HRS may develop in any type of cirrhosis, it is most common in individuals with alcoholic cirrhosis, particularly if there is concomitant alcoholic hepatitis identifiable on liver biopsies. HRS can also occur in individuals without cirrhosis, but with acute onset of liver failure, termed fulminant liver failure.

Certain precipitants of HRS have been identified in vulnerable individuals with cirrhosis or fulminant liver failure. These include bacterial infection, acute alcoholic hepatitis, or bleeding in the upper gastrointestinal tract. Spontaneous bacterial peritonitis, which is the infection of ascites fluid, is the most common precipitant of HRS in cirrhotic individuals. HRS can sometimes be triggered by treatments for complications of liver disease: iatrogenic precipitants of HRS include the aggressive use of diuretic medications or the removal of large volumes of ascitic fluid by paracentesis from the abdominal cavity without compensating for fluid losses by intravenous replacement.

== Diagnosis ==
There can be many causes of kidney failure in individuals with cirrhosis or fulminant liver failure. Consequently, it is a challenge to distinguish hepatorenal syndrome from other entities that cause kidney failure in the setting of advanced liver disease. As a result, additional major and minor criteria have been developed to assist in the diagnosis of hepatorenal syndrome.

The major criteria include liver disease with portal hypertension; kidney failure; the absence of shock, infection, recent treatment with medications that affect the function of the kidney (nephrotoxins), and fluid losses; the absence of sustained improvement in kidney function despite treatment with 1.5 litres of intravenous normal saline; the absence of proteinuria (protein in the urine); and, the absence of kidney disease or obstruction of kidney outflow as seen on ultrasound.

The minor criteria are the following: a low urine volume (less than 500 mL (18 imp fl oz; 17 US fl oz) per day), low sodium concentration in the urine, a urine osmolality that is greater than that in the blood, the absence of red blood cells in the urine, and a serum sodium concentration of less than 130 mmol/L.

Many other diseases of the kidney are associated with liver disease and must be excluded before making a diagnosis of hepatorenal syndrome. Individuals with pre-renal kidney failure do not have damage to the kidneys, but as in individuals with HRS, have kidney dysfunction due to decreased blood flow to the kidneys. Also, similarly to HRS, pre-renal kidney failure causes the formation of urine that has a very low sodium concentration. In contrast to HRS, however, pre-renal kidney failure usually responds to treatment with intravenous fluids, resulting in reduction in serum creatinine and increased excretion of sodium. Acute tubular necrosis (ATN) involves damage to the tubules of the kidney, and can be a complication in individuals with cirrhosis, because of exposure to toxic medications or the development of decreased blood pressure. Because of the damage to the tubules, ATN affected kidneys usually are unable to maximally resorb sodium from the urine. As a result, ATN can be distinguished from HRS on the basis of laboratory testing, as individuals with ATN will have urine sodium measurements that are much higher than in HRS; however, this may not always be the case in cirrhotics. Individuals with ATN also may have evidence of hyaline casts or muddy-brown casts in the urine on microscopy, whereas the urine of individuals with HRS is typically devoid of cellular material, as the kidneys have not been directly injured. Some viral infections of the liver, including hepatitis B and hepatitis C can also lead to inflammation of the glomerulus of the kidney. Other causes of kidney failure in individuals with liver disease include drug toxicity (notably, the antibiotic gentamicin) or contrast nephropathy, caused by intravenous administration of contrast agents used for medical imaging tests.

== Pathophysiology ==
Schematic demonstrating the underfill theory to explain the pathophysiology of both ascites and hepatorenal syndrome.

Diagram showing hypothesized correlation between clinical features and pathophysiology of ascites and hepatorenal syndrome.

The kidney failure in hepatorenal syndrome is believed to arise from abnormalities in blood vessel tone in the kidneys. The predominant theory (termed the underfill theory) is that blood vessels in the kidney circulation are constricted because of the dilation of blood vessels in the splanchnic circulation (which supplies the intestines), which is mediated by factors released by liver disease. Nitric oxide, prostaglandins, and other vasoactive substances have been hypothesized as powerful mediators of splanchnic vasodilation in cirrhosis. The consequence of this phenomenon is a decrease in the "effective" volume of blood sensed by the juxtaglomerular apparatus, leading to the secretion of renin and the activation of the renin–angiotensin system, which results in the vasoconstriction of vessels systemically and in the kidney specifically. However, the effect of this is insufficient to counteract the mediators of vasodilation in the splanchnic circulation, leading to persistent "underfilling" of the kidney circulation and worsening kidney vasoconstriction, leading to kidney failure.

Studies to quantify this theory have shown that there is an overall decreased systemic vascular resistance in hepatorenal syndrome, but that the measured femoral and kidney fractions of cardiac output are respectively increased and reduced, suggesting that splanchnic vasodilation is implicated in the kidney failure. Many vasoactive chemicals have been hypothesized as being involved in mediating the systemic hemodynamic changes, including atrial natriuretic factor, prostacyclin, thromboxane A2, and endotoxin. In addition to this, it has been observed that the administration of medications to counteract splanchnic vasodilation (such as ornipressin, terlipressin, and octreotide) leads to improvement in glomerular filtration rate (which is a quantitative measure of kidney function) in patients with hepatorenal syndrome, providing further evidence that splanchnic vasodilation is a key feature of its pathogenesis.

The underfill theory involves activation of the renin–angiotensin–aldosterone system, which leads to an increase in absorption of sodium from the kidney tubule (termed renal sodium avidity) mediated by aldosterone, which acts on mineralocorticoid receptors in the distal convoluted tubule. This is believed to be a key step in the pathogenesis of ascites in cirrhotics as well. It has been hypothesized that the progression from ascites to hepatorenal syndrome is a spectrum where splanchnic vasodilation defines both resistance to diuretic medications in ascites (which is commonly seen in type 2 HRS) and the onset of kidney vasoconstriction (as described above) leading to hepatorenal syndrome.

== Prevention ==
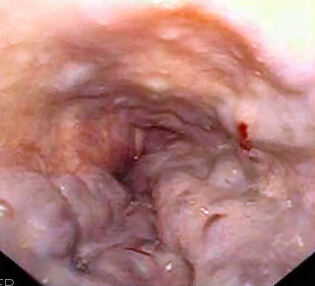
Picture of the esophagus at the time of endoscopy showing prominent esophageal varices. Bleeding from esophageal varices can be a precipitant for hepatorenal syndrome in individuals with cirrhosis, and can be prevented by early diagnosis and treatment.

The risk of death in hepatorenal syndrome is very high; consequently, there is a significant emphasis on the identification of patients who are at risk for HRS, and prevention of triggers for onset of HRS. As infection (specifically spontaneous bacterial peritonitis) and gastrointestinal hemorrhage are both complications in individuals with cirrhosis, and are common triggers for HRS, specific care is made in early identification and treatment of cirrhotics with these complications to prevent HRS. Some of the triggers for HRS are induced by treatment of ascites and can be preventable. The aggressive use of diuretic medications should be avoided. In addition, many medications that are either used to treat cirrhotic complications (such as some antibiotics) or other conditions may cause sufficient impairment in kidney function in the cirrhotic to lead to HRS. Also, large volume paracentesis—which is the removal of ascites fluid from the abdomen using a needle or catheter in order to relieve discomfort—may cause enough alteration in hemodynamics to precipitate HRS, and should be avoided in individuals at risk. The concomitant infusion of albumin can avert the circulatory dysfunction that occurs after large-volume paracentesis and may prevent HRS. Conversely, in individuals with very tense ascites, it has been hypothesized that removal of ascitic fluid may improve kidney function if it decreases the pressure on the renal veins.

Individuals with ascites that have become infected spontaneously (termed spontaneous bacterial peritonitis or SBP) are at an especially high risk for the development of HRS. In individuals with SBP, one randomized controlled trial found that the administration of intravenous albumin on the day of admission and on the third day in hospital reduced both the rate of kidney insufficiency and the mortality rate.

== Treatment ==
=== Transplantation ===
The definitive treatment for hepatorenal syndrome is liver transplantation, and all other therapies can best be described as bridges to transplantation. While liver transplantation is by far the best available management option for HRS, the mortality of individuals with HRS has been shown to be as high as 25% within the first month after transplantation. Individuals with HRS and evidence of greater hepatic dysfunction (quantified as MELD scores above 36) have been found to be at greatest risk of early mortality after liver transplantation. A further deterioration of kidney function even after liver transplantation in individuals with HRS has been demonstrated in several studies; however, this is transient and thought to be due to the use of medications with toxicity to the kidneys, and specifically the introduction of immunosuppressants such as tacrolimus and cyclosporine that are known to worsen kidney function. Over the long-term, however, individuals with HRS who are the recipients of liver transplants almost universally recover kidney function, and studies show that their survival rates at three years are similar to those who have received liver transplants for reasons other than HRS.

In anticipation of liver transplantation (which may be associated with considerable in-hospital delay), several other strategies have been found to be beneficial in preserving kidney function. These include the use of intravenous albumin infusion, medications (for which the best evidence is for analogues of vasopressin, which causes splanchnic vasoconstriction), radiological shunts to decrease pressure in the portal vein, dialysis, and a specialized albumin-bound membrane dialysis system termed molecular adsorbents recirculation system (MARS) or liver dialysis.

=== Medical therapy ===
Many major studies showing improvement in kidney function in patients with hepatorenal syndrome have involved expansion of the volume of the plasma with albumin given intravenously. The quantity of albumin administered intravenously varies: one cited regimen is 1 gram of albumin per kilogram of body weight intravenously on the first day, followed by 20 to 40 grams daily. Notably, studies have shown that treatment with albumin alone is inferior to treatment with other medications in conjunction with albumin; most studies evaluating pre-transplant therapies for HRS involve the use of albumin in conjunction with other medical or procedural treatment.

Midodrine is an alpha-agonist and octreotide is an analogue of somatostatin, a hormone involved in regulation of blood vessel tone in the gastrointestinal tract. The medications are respectively systemic vasoconstrictors and inhibitors of splanchnic vasodilation, and were not found to be useful when used individually in treatment of hepatorenal syndrome. However, one study of 13 patients with hepatorenal syndrome showed significant improvement in kidney function when the two were used together (with midodrine given orally, octreotide given subcutaneously and both dosed according to blood pressure), with three patients surviving to discharge. Another nonrandomized, observational study of individuals with HRS treated with subcutaneous octreotide and oral midodrine showed that there was increased survival at 30 days.

The vasopressin analogue ornipressin was found in a number of studies to be useful in improvement of kidney function in patients with hepatorenal syndrome, but has been limited in its use, as it can cause severe ischemia to major organs. Terlipressin is a vasopressin analogue that has been found in one large study to be useful for improving kidney function in patients with hepatorenal syndrome with a lesser incidence of ischemia. A randomized control trial led by Florence Wong demonstrated improved renal function in individuals with Type 1 HRS treated with terlipressin and albumin over placebo. A key criticism of all of these medical therapies has been heterogeneity in the populations investigated and the use of kidney function, instead of mortality, as an outcome measure.

Other agents that have been investigated for use in treatment of HRS include pentoxifylline, acetylcysteine, and misoprostol. The evidence for all of these therapies is based on either case series, or in the case of pentoxifylline, extrapolated from a subset of patients treated for alcoholic hepatitis.

=== Procedural treatments ===
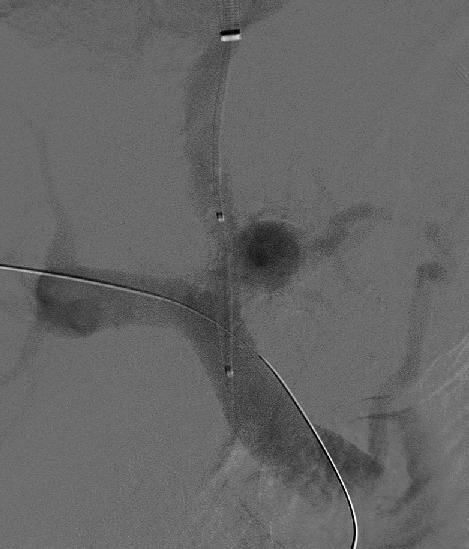
TIPS, shown in progress here, has been shown to improve kidney function in individuals with HRS if portal pressures decrease after the procedure.

A transjugular intrahepatic portosystemic shunt (TIPS) involves the decompression of the high pressures in the portal circulation by placing a small stent between a portal and hepatic vein. This is done through radiologically guided catheters which are passed into the hepatic vein either through the internal jugular vein or the femoral vein. Theoretically, a decrease in portal pressures is thought to reverse the hemodynamic phenomena that ultimately lead to the development of hepatorenal syndrome. TIPS has been shown to improve kidney function in patients with hepatorenal syndrome. Complications of TIPS for treatment of HRS include the worsening of hepatic encephalopathy (as the procedure involves the forced creation of a porto-systemic shunt, effectively bypassing the ability of the liver to clear toxins), inability to achieve adequate reduction in portal pressure, and bleeding.

Liver dialysis involves extracorporeal dialysis to remove toxins from the circulation, usually through the addition of a second dialysis circuit that contains an albumin-bound membrane. The molecular adsorbents recirculation system (MARS) has shown some utility as a bridge to transplantation in patients with hepatorenal syndrome, yet the technique is still nascent.

Renal replacement therapy may be required to bridge individuals with hepatorenal syndrome to liver transplantation, although the condition of the patient may dictate the modality used. The use of dialysis, however, does not lead to recuperation or preservation of kidney function in patients with HRS, and is essentially only used to avoid complications of kidney failure until transplantation can take place. In patients who undergo hemodialysis, there may even be an increased risk of mortality due to low blood pressure in patients with HRS, although appropriate studies have yet to be performed. As a result, the role of renal replacement therapy in patients with HRS remains unclear.

== Epidemiology ==
As the majority of individuals with hepatorenal syndrome have cirrhosis, much of the epidemiological data on HRS comes from the cirrhotic population. The condition is quite common: approximately 10% of individuals admitted to hospital with ascites have HRS. A retrospective case series of cirrhotic patients treated with terlipressin suggested that 20.0% of acute kidney failure in cirrhotics was due to type 1 HRS, and 6.6% was due to type 2 HRS. It is estimated that 18% of individuals with cirrhosis and ascites will develop HRS within one year of their diagnosis with cirrhosis, and 39% of these individuals will develop HRS within five years of diagnosis. Three independent risk factors for the development of HRS in cirrhotics have been identified: liver size, plasma renin activity, and serum sodium concentration.

The prognosis of these patients is grim with untreated patients having an extremely short survival. The severity of liver disease (as evidenced by the MELD score) has been shown to be a determinant of outcome. Some patients without cirrhosis develop HRS, with an incidence of about 20% seen in one study of ill patients with alcoholic hepatitis.

== History ==
The first reports of kidney failure occurring in individuals with chronic liver diseases were from the late 19th century by Frerichs and Flint. However, the hepatorenal syndrome was first defined as acute kidney failure that occurred in the setting of biliary surgery. The syndrome was soon re-associated with advanced liver disease, and, in the 1950s, was clinically defined by Sherlock, Hecker, Papper, and Vessin as being associated with systemic hemodynamic abnormalities and high mortality. Hecker and Sherlock specifically identified that individuals with HRS had low urinary output, very low sodium in the urine, and no protein in the urine. Murray Epstein was the first to characterize splanchnic vasodilation and kidney vasoconstriction as the key alterations in hemodynamics in patients with the syndrome. The functional nature of the kidney impairment in HRS was crystallized by studies demonstrating that kidneys transplanted from patients with hepatorenal syndrome returned to function in the new host, leading to the hypothesis that hepatorenal syndrome was a systemic condition and not a kidney disease. The first systematic attempt to define hepatorenal syndrome was made in 1994 by the International Ascites Club, a group of liver specialists. The more recent history of HRS has involved elucidation of the various vasoactive mediators that cause the splanchnic and kidney blood flow abnormalities of the condition.
