= Nodular regenerative hyperplasia =

- Other names: Nodular regenerative hyperplasia of the liver
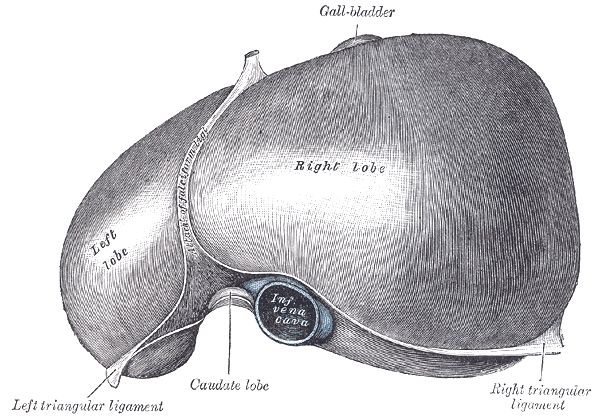
- Human liver(normal)
- Complications: Portal hypertension

Nodular regenerative hyperplasia (NRH) is a rare liver disease, characterised by the growth of nodules within the liver, resulting in liver hyperplasia. While in many cases it is asymptomatic and thus goes undetected – or is only discovered incidentally while investigating some other medical condition – in some people it results in non-cirrhotic portal hypertension (NCPH). NCPH is generally less severe than the much more common portal hypertension due to cirrhosis. Complications of NCPH can include jaundice, ascites, splenomegaly, and bleeding esophageal varices. Most people with NRH retain normal liver function – even among the subset who go on to develop NCPH – and liver failure in NRH is uncommon. Only a small proportion of NRH patients will ever require liver transplantation.

The causes of NRH are poorly understood, although it is believed to be related to abnormal blood flow in the small vessels of the liver. NRH development may be preceded by an attack of sinusoidal obstructive syndrome. Some cases are known to be caused by treatment with azathioprine, an immunosuppressant drug commonly used to prevent rejection in organ transplantation (especially of the kidneys), and to treat various auto-immune disorders. Other drug treatments, such as with oxaliplatin, can also contribute. Medical conditions associated with NRH include cystic fibrosis, common variable immunodeficiency and chronic granulomatous disease. Cases may also arise after solid-organ transplantation.
