= Puddle sign =

- Differential diagnosis: ascites

In gastroenterology, the puddle sign is a physical examination maneuver that can be used to detect the presence of ascites. It is useful for detecting small amounts of ascites—as small as 120 mL; shifting dullness and bulging flanks typically require 500 mL.

The steps are outlined as follows:

1. Patient lies prone for 5 minutes
2. Patient then rises onto elbows and knees
3. Apply stethoscope diaphragm to most dependent part of the abdomen
4. Examiner repeatedly flicks near flank with finger. Continue to flick at same spot on abdomen
5. Move stethoscope across abdomen away from examiner
6. Sound loudness increases at further edge of puddle
7. Sound transmission does not change when patient sits

In relation to auscultatory percussion, the puddle sign is more specific, but less sensitive.

== See also ==
- Abdominal examination
- Fluid wave test
- Bulging flanks
