= WHVP =

WHVP may stand for:

- Wedged hepatic vein pressure
- WHVP (FM), a radio station in Hudson, New York
