= Portal hypertension =

Abnormally increased portal venous pressure

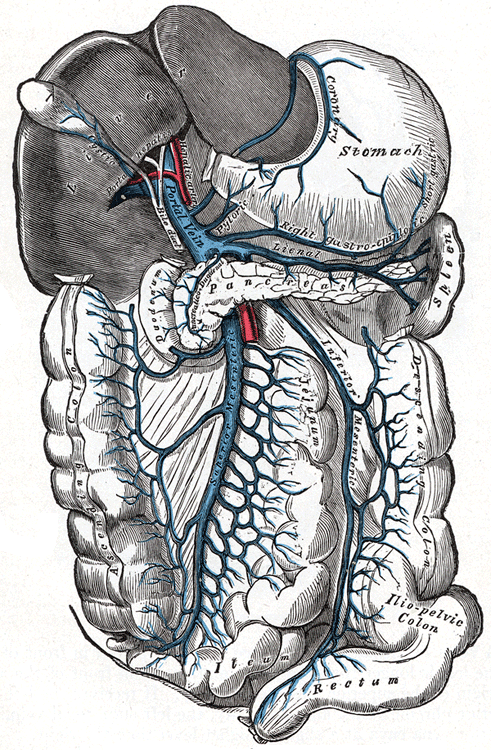
- The portal vein and its tributaries
- Specialty: Gastroenterology
- Symptoms: Ascites
- Causes: Splenic vein thrombosis, stenosis of portal vein
- Diagnostic method: Ultrasonography
- Treatment: Portosystemic shunts, Nonselective beta-blockers

Portal hypertension is defined as increased portal venous pressure, with a hepatic venous pressure gradient greater than 5 mmHg. Normal portal pressure is 1–4 mmHg; clinically insignificant portal hypertension is present at portal pressures 5–9 mmHg; clinically significant portal hypertension is present at portal pressures greater than 10 mmHg. The portal vein and its branches supply most of the blood and nutrients from the intestine to the liver.

Cirrhosis (a form of chronic liver failure) is the most common cause of portal hypertension; other, less frequent causes are therefore grouped as non-cirrhotic portal hypertension. The signs and symptoms of both cirrhotic and non-cirrhotic portal hypertension are often similar depending on cause, with patients presenting with abdominal swelling due to ascites, vomiting of blood, and lab abnormalities such as elevated liver enzymes or low platelet counts.

Treatment is directed towards decreasing portal hypertension itself or in the management of its acute and chronic complications. Complications include ascites, spontaneous bacterial peritonitis, variceal hemorrhage, hepatic encephalopathy, hepatorenal syndrome, and cardiomyopathy.

== Signs and symptoms ==
Signs and symptoms of portal hypertension include:

- Abdominal swelling and tightness due to ascites, which is free fluid in the peritoneal cavity
- Vomiting blood (hematemesis) from gastric or esophageal varices
- Anorectal varices
- Increased spleen size (splenomegaly), which may lead to lower platelet counts (thrombocytopenia)
- Swollen veins on the anterior abdominal wall (referred to as caput medusae)

In addition, a widened (dilated) portal vein as seen on a CT scan or MRI may raise the suspicion about portal hypertension. A cutoff value of 13 mm is widely used in this regard, but the diameter is often larger than this in normal individuals as well.

=== Complications ===
==== Ascites ====
The activation of neurohumoral factors as described in the "Pathophysiology" section results in a high volume state due to sodium and water retention. Additionally, with cirrhosis, there is increased hydrostatic pressure and decreased production of albumin, which lead to decreased oncotic pressure.

The management of ascites needs to be gradual to avoid sudden changes in systemic volume status, which can precipitate hepatic encephalopathy, kidney failure, and death. The management includes salt restriction in diet, diuretics to urinate excess salt and water (furosemide, spironolactone), paracentesis to manually remove the ascitic fluid, and transjugular intrahepatic portosystemic shunt (TIPS).

==== Spontaneous bacterial peritonitis ====
In cirrhosis, there is bacterial overgrowth in the intestinal tract and increased permeability of the intestinal wall. These bacteria (most commonly E. coli & Klebsiella) are able to pass through the intestinal wall and into ascitic fluid, leading to an inflammatory response.

Antibiotic treatment is usually with a third generation cephalosporin (ceftriaxone or cefotaxime) after a diagnostic paracentesis. Patients are also given albumin.

Primary prevention is given to high-risk groups; secondary prevention is given to anyone who has previously been diagnosed with SBP. Medications for prevention are usually fluoroquinolones or sulfonamides.

==== Variceal hemorrhage ====
Increased portal pressure leads to dilation of existing vessels and the formation of new vascular connections. These newly formed vascular connections are weak and prone to rupture, which leads to bleeding. Esophageal varices are due to a connection between the left gastric vein and the azygos-hemiazygos veins; gastroesophageal varices are due to connections between either the anterior branch of the left gastric vein and esophageal veins or the short gastric & posterior gastric vein and esophageal veins.

Both pharmacological (non-specific β-blockers, nitrate isosorbide mononitrate, vasopressin such as terlipressin) and endoscopic (banding ligation) treatment have similar results. TIPS (transjugular intrahepatic portosystemic shunting) is effective at reducing the rate of rebleeding.

The management of active variceal bleeding includes administering vasoactive drugs (somatostatin, octreotide), endoscopic banding ligation, balloon tamponade and TIPS.

==== Hepatic encephalopathy ====
In portal hypertension, ammonia levels increase and this ammonia can cross the blood brain barrier. As brain cells attempt to clear the ammonia, glutamine is formed excessively, which results in swelling of brain cells and neurologic dysfunction.

A treatment plan may involve lactulose, enemas, and use of antibiotics such as rifaximin, neomycin, vancomycin, and the quinolones. Restriction of dietary protein was recommended but this is now refuted by a clinical trial which shows no benefit. Instead, the maintenance of adequate nutrition is now advocated.

==== Hepatorenal syndrome ====
Activation of neurohumoral factors (discussed in the Pathophysiology section) leads to renal vasoconstriction, which results in decreased blood supply to the kidneys and therefore, a decreased glomerular filtration rate. This can be an acute kidney injury (HRS type 1) or a slowly progressive kidney failure (HRS type 2).

Management depends on whether or not patients are in the intensive care unit (ICU). When not in the ICU, patients are given albumin and splanchnic vasoconstrictors such as terlipressin. This use of splanchnic vasoconstrictors increases mean arterial pressure, which increases the amount of blood supplied to the kidneys.

==== Cardiomyopathy ====
Initially, the heart compensates for the decreased effective arterial blood volume that is the result of splanchnic vasodilation by increasing cardiac output, which results in high-output heart failure.

Non-selective beta blockers have been successful in some clinical studies. Patients are also treated with diuretics. Liver transplant may reverse the cardiomyopathy.

== Causes ==
The causes for portal hypertension are classified as originating in the portal venous system before it reaches the liver (prehepatic causes), within the liver (intrahepatic) or between the liver and the heart (post-hepatic). The most common cause is cirrhosis (chronic liver failure). Other causes include:

Prehepatic causes

- Portal vein thrombosis
- Splenic vein thrombosis
- Arteriovenous fistula (increased portal blood flow)
- Splenomegaly and/or hypersplenism (increased portal blood flow)

Hepatic causes

- Cirrhosis of any cause.
  - alcohol use disorder
  - chronic viral hepatitis
  - biliary atresia
  - Primary biliary cirrhosis
- Primary sclerosing cholangitis
- Chronic pancreatitis
- Hereditary haemorrhagic telangiectasia
- Schistosomiasis
- Congenital hepatic fibrosis
- Nodular regenerative hyperplasia
- Fibrosis of space of Disse
- Granulomatous or infiltrative liver diseases (Gaucher disease, mucopolysaccharidosis, sarcoidosis, lymphoproliferative malignancies, amyloidosis, etc.)
- Toxicity (from arsenic, copper, vinyl chloride monomers, mineral oil, vitamin A, azathioprine, dacarbazine, methotrexate, amiodarone, etc.)
- Viral hepatitis
- Fatty liver disease
- Veno-occlusive disease

Posthepatic causes

- Inferior vena cava obstruction
- Right-sided heart failure, e.g. from constrictive pericarditis
- Budd–Chiari syndrome also known as hepatic vein thrombosis

== Pathophysiology ==
Stellate cell

=== Cirrhotic portal hypertension ===
The pathophysiology of cirrhotic portal hypertension is indicated by increased resistance to blood flow in vessels via different mechanisms. There is sinusoidal endothelial cell dysfunction (SEC), hepatic stellate cell (HSC) activation, Kupffer cell activation, and myofibroblast activation.Normally, SECs generate nitric oxide, which has several functions, including the maintenance of vascular tone and prevention of HSC activation. HSC activation results in liver fibrosis, which also predisposes to portal hypertension.

Nitric oxide is an endogenous vasodilator and it regulates intrahepatic vascular tone (it is produced from L-arginine). Nitric oxide inhibition has been shown in some studies to increase portal hypertension and hepatic response to norepinephrine.Rising portal pressures leads to increased production of vasodilators, defective response to vasoconstrictors, and the formation of new blood vessels all within the splanchnic circulation. All of this is done in order to recruit more blood to sinusoids, thereby promoting more blood flow within the portal vein, further contributing to portal hypertension. Splanchnic vasodilation results in decreased effective arterial blood volume, causing low blood pressure. To compensate for this low blood pressure, neurohumoral factors (RAAS, SNS, ADH) are activated, leading to sodium and water retention, and therefore, a high volume state.

=== Non-cirrhotic portal hypertension ===
The pathophysiology of non-cirrhotic portal hypertension is most commonly disrupted blood flow to or from the liver. This results in a backing up of blood in either the liver or the vessels supplying it, leading to an increased portal pressure.

== Diagnosis ==
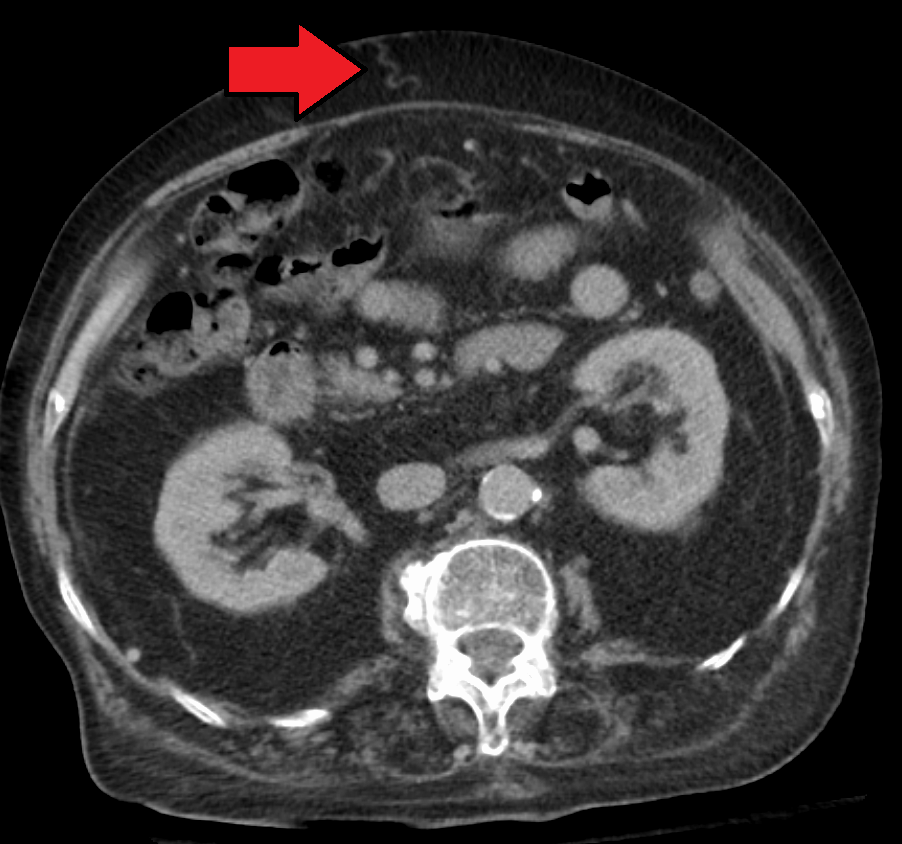
Portal hypertension due to cirrhosis resulting in revascularization of the umbilical vein

Ultrasonography (US) is the first-line imaging technique for the diagnosis and follow-up of portal hypertension because it is non-invasive, low-cost and can be performed on-site.

A dilated portal vein (diameter of greater than 13 or 15 mm) is a sign of portal hypertension, with a sensitivity estimated at 12.5% or 40%. On Doppler ultrasonography, a slow velocity of <16 cm/s in addition to dilatation in the main portal vein are diagnostic of portal hypertension. Other signs of portal hypertension on ultrasound include a portal flow mean velocity of less than 12 cm/s, porto–systemic collateral veins (patent paraumbilical vein, spleno–renal collaterals and dilated left and short gastric veins), splenomegaly and signs of cirrhosis (including nodularity of the liver surface).

The hepatic venous pressure gradient (HVPG) measurement has been accepted as the gold standard for assessing the severity of portal hypertension. Portal hypertension is defined as HVPG greater than or equal to 5 mmHg and is considered to be clinically significant when HVPG exceeds 10 to 12 mmHg.

== Treatment ==
=== Portosystemic shunts ===
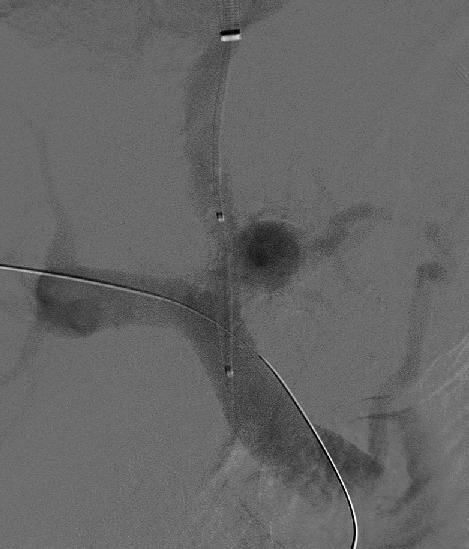
Fluoroscopic image of transjugular intrahepatic portosystemic shunt (TIPS)

Selective shunts select non-intestinal flow to be shunted to the systemic venous drainage while leaving the intestinal venous drainage to continue to pass through the liver. The most well known of this type is the splenorenal.

This connects the splenic vein to the left renal vein thus reducing portal system pressure while minimizing any encephalopathy. In an H-shunt, which could be mesocaval (from the superior mesenteric vein to the inferior vena cava) or could be, portocaval (from the portal vein to the inferior vena cava) a graft, either synthetic or the preferred vein harvested from elsewhere on the patient's body, is connected between the superior mesenteric vein and the inferior vena cava. The size of this shunt will determine how selective it is.

With the advent of transjugular intrahepatic portosystemic shunting (TIPS), portosystemic shunts are less performed. TIPS has the advantage of being easier to perform and doesn't disrupt the liver's vascularity.
