= Peritoneal fluid =

Fluid made by the peritoneum

Peritoneal fluid is a serous fluid made by the peritoneum in the abdominal cavity which lubricates the surface of tissue that lines the abdominal wall and pelvic cavity. It covers most of the organs in the abdomen. An increased volume of peritoneal fluid is called ascites.

Sampling of peritoneal fluid is generally performed by paracentesis.

== Peritoneal fluid analysis ==
The serum-ascites albumin gradient (SAAG) is the most useful index for evaluating peritoneal fluid and can help distinguish ascites caused by portal hypertension (cirrhosis, portal vein thrombosis, Budd-Chiari syndrome, etc.) from other causes of ascites. SAAG is calculated by subtracting the albumin measure of ascitic fluid from the serum value. In portal hypertension, the SAAG is >1.1 g/dL while ascites from other causes shows a SAAG of less than 1.1 g/dL.

Peritoneal fluid microscopy is a useful test in evaluating the cause of ascites. A diagnostic peritoneal lavage (DPL) is considered positive if any of the following are present

1. >15 mL gross blood
2. RBCs >100,000/mL
3. WBCs >500/mL
4. Bacteria present on Gram stain

Bacteria and white blood cells, when present in a patient with a history of ascites (usually due to cirrhosis) is highly suggestive of spontaneous bacterial peritonitis.
