= Fluid wave test =

- Purpose: test for ascites

In medicine, the fluid wave test or fluid thrill test is a test for ascites (free fluid in the peritoneal cavity). It is performed by having the patient (or a colleague) push their hands down on the midline of the abdomen. The examiner then taps one flank, while feeling on the other flank for the tap. The pressure on the midline prevents vibrations through the abdominal wall while the fluid allows the tap to be felt on the other side. The result is considered positive if tap can be felt on the other side. However, even with the midline pressure, transmission through the skin must be excluded. A positive fluid wave test indicates that there is a free fluid (ascites) in the abdomen. When one side of the abdomen is pressed, the other side may also be painful due to the transfer of the fluid in it.

== See also ==
- Abdominal examination
- Bulging flanks
- Puddle sign
- Shifting dullness
