= Shifting dullness =

Medical sign

In medicine, shifting dullness refers to a sign elicited on physical examination for ascites (fluid in the peritoneal cavity).

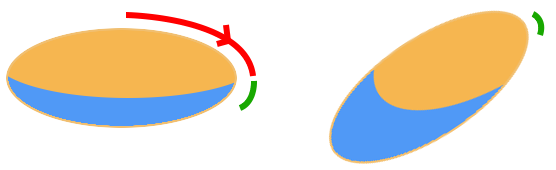
The two steps of shifting dullness. Percussion of the green section shifts from a dull note to a tympanic note after the patient changes from supine to lateral decubitus position.

The test is performed by first percussing the midline of the abdomen to elicit a resonant note due to gas in the abdomen. If there is no area of resonance, then the test cannot be performed. Percussion is then moved progressively more laterally (away from the examiner) – this is depicted as the red section in the diagram on the right – until the note becomes dull, as depicted by the green section. The examiner's index finger remains on the resonant side, and the middle finger remains on the dull side, straddling the fluid-air level. The patient is then asked to lean on their right lateral side (assuming the examiner used the traditional right-sided approach). This stabilises the patient by positioning them between the examiner's hands and body. It is imperative that the examiner's fingers stay in the same position. After waiting sufficient time for any fluid to shift (up to 30 seconds), the dull position is then percussed. It may now be resonant. The percussion may now be performed down the anterior side until a new dullness is found. To confirm a positive result it is recommended that the now resonant area become dull again when the patient is back in the supine position.

If the borders between tympanitic (resonant) and dull notes remain the same, the person probably does not have ascites, or has less than 2 litres of free fluid present. If the fluid causing the dullness was not free, then the air-fluid level would not move. Shifting dullness is usually present if the volume of ascitic fluid is up to 500 mL ml. If low volume ascites is suspected, then an attempt to elicit the puddle sign may be performed.

== See also ==
- Abdominal examination
- Fluid wave test
- Bulging flanks
- Puddle sign
