= Portal venous pressure =

Blood pressure in the hepatic portal vein

Portal venous pressure is the blood pressure in the hepatic portal vein, and is normally between 5 and 10 mmHg. Raised portal venous pressure is termed portal hypertension, and has numerous sequelae such as ascites and hepatic encephalopathy.

== Wedged hepatic venous pressure (WHVP) ==
Wedged hepatic venous pressure (WHVP) is used to estimate the portal venous pressure by reflecting not the actual hepatic portal vein pressure but the hepatic sinusoidal pressure. It is determined by wedging a catheter in a hepatic vein, to occlude it, and then measuring the pressure of proximal static blood (which is reflective of pressure in the sinusoids). WHVP in fact slightly underestimates portal pressure due to sinusoidal equilibration in patients without cirrhosis, but the difference between the two is clinically insignificant. In patients with cirrhotic livers intersinusoidal communication is disrupted such that sinusoidal pressure equilibrium cannot be maintained, and so WHVP becomes a far more accurate measure of portal venous pressure.

== Hepatic venous pressure gradient (HVPG) ==
Hepatic venous pressure gradient (HVPG) is a clinical measurement of the pressure gradient between the WHVP and the free hepatic venous pressures (FHVP), and thus is an estimate of the pressure gradient between the portal vein and the inferior vena cava. An HVPG of ≥5 mmHg defines portal hypertension, and if the measurement exceeds 10 mmHg it is called clinically significant portal hypertension. Above 12 mm Hg, variceal haemorrhage may occur. While not widely performed, its assessment in people with chronic liver disease is recommended to monitor response to treatment.
