= Liver support system =

Therapeutic device

Liver support systems
- Specialty: Hepatology

A liver support system or diachysis is a type of therapeutic device to assist in performing the functions of the liver. Such systems focus either on removing the accumulating toxins (liver dialysis), or providing additional replacement of the metabolic functions of the liver through the inclusion of hepatocytes to the device (bioartificial liver device). A diachysis machine is used for acute care i.e. emergency care, as opposed to a dialysis machine which are typically used over the longer term. These systems are being trialed to help people with acute liver failure (ALF) or acute-on-chronic liver failure.

The primary functions of the liver include removing toxic substances from the blood, manufacturing blood proteins, storing energy in the form of glycogen, and secreting bile. The hepatocytes that perform these tasks can be killed or impaired by disease, resulting in acute liver failure (ALF) which can be seen in person with previously diseased liver or a healthy one.

== Etymology ==
- The word diachysis derives from the Greek word, διάχυσησ, which means "Diffusion"
- The word dialysis derives from the Greek word, διάλυσις, which means "Dissolution"

== Liver failure ==
Classification of acute liver failure
	Hyperacute	Acute	Subacute
Interval between jaundice and encephalopathy (days)	0-7	8-28	29-84
Survival (%) without liver transplant	36	7	14
Coagulation disorder	+++	++	+
Jaundice	+	++	+++
Cerebral edema	++	++	+/-
Most frequent etiology	Paracetamol; Hepatitis A Hepatitis E Ischemia	Hepatitis B drugs	Non-paracetamol

In hyperacute and acute liver failure, the clinical picture develops rapidly with progressive encephalopathy and multiorgan dysfunction such as hyperdynamic circulation, coagulopathy, acute kidney injury and respiratory insufficiency, severe metabolic alterations, and cerebral edema that can lead to brain death. In these cases the mortality without liver transplantation (LTx) ranges between 40-80%. LTx is the only effective treatment for these patients although it requires a precise indication and timing to achieve good results. Nevertheless, due to the scarcity of organs to carry out liver transplantations, it is estimated that one third of patients with ALF die while waiting to be transplanted.

On the other hand, a patient with a chronic hepatic disease can suffer acute decompensation of liver function following a precipitating event such as variceal bleeding, sepsis and excessive alcohol intake among others that can lead to a condition referred to as acute-on-chronic liver failure (ACLF).

Both types of hepatic insufficiency, ALF and ACLF, can potentially be reversible and liver functionality can return to a level similar to that prior to the insult or precipitating event.

LTx has shown an improvement in the prognosis and survival with severe cases of ALF. Nevertheless, cost and donor scarcity have prompted researchers to look for new supportive treatments that can act as "bridge" to the transplant procedure. By stabilizing the patient's clinical state, or by creating the right conditions that could allow the recovery of native liver functions, both detoxification and synthesis can improve, after an episode of ALF or ACLF.

Three different types of supportive therapies have been developed: bio-artificial, artificial and hybrid liver support systems (Table 2).

Table 2: Liver Support Systems
Bio-artificial	Artificial	Hybrids
ELAD Extracorporeal liver assist device	MARS Molecular adsorbent recirculating system	Hepat-Assist
BLSS Bioartificial Liver Support System	Prometheus FPSA Fractionated plasma separation and adsorption system	TECLA-HALSS TECA-Hybrid Artificial Liver Support System
RFB Radial Flow Bioreactor	SPAD Single-pass albumin dialysis	MELS Modular Extracorporeal Liver Support
AMC-BAL Bioartificial Liver	SEPET Selective plasma filtration therapy	-

== Bioartificial liver devices ==
Bioartificial liver device
- Specialty: Internal medicine

Bioartificial liver devices are experimental extracorporeal devices that use living cell lines to provide detoxification and synthesis support to the failing liver. Bio-artificial liver (BAL) Hepatassist 2000 uses porcine hepatocytes whereas ELAD system employs hepatocytes derived from human hepatoblastoma C3A cell lines. Both techniques can produce, in fulminant hepatic failure (FHF), an improvement of hepatic encephalopathy grade and biochemical parameters. Potential side effects that have been documented include immunological issues (porcine endogenous retrovirus transmission), infectious complications, and tumor transmigration.

Other biological hepatic systems are Bioartificial Liver Support (BLSS) and Radial Flow Bioreactor (RFB). Detoxification capacity of these systems is poor and therefore they must be used combined with other systems to mitigate this deficiency. Today, its use is limited to centers with high experience in their application.

A bioartificial liver device (BAL) is an artificial extracorporeal liver support (ELS) system for an individual who is suffering from acute liver failure (ALF) or acute-on-chronic liver failure (ACLF). The fundamental difference between artificial and BAL systems lies in the inclusion of hepatocytes into the reactor, often operating alongside the purification circuits used in artificial ELS systems. The overall design varies between different BAL systems, but they largely follow the same basic structure, with patient blood or plasma flow through an artificial matrix housing hepatocytes. Plasma is often separated from the patient's blood to improve efficiency of the system, and the device can be connected to artificial liver dialysis devices in order to further increase the effectiveness of the device in filtration of toxins. The inclusion of functioning hepatocytes in the reactor allows the restoration of some of the synthetic functions that the patient's liver is lacking.

=== History ===
==== Early history ====
The first bioartificial liver device was developed in 1993 by Dr. Achilles A. Demetriou at Cedars-Sinai Medical Center. The bioartificial liver helped an 18-year-old southern California woman survive without her own liver for 14 hours until she received a human liver using a 20-inch-long, 4-inch-wide plastic cylinder filled with cellulose fibers and pig liver cells. Blood was routed outside the patient's body and through the artificial liver before being returned to the body.

Dr. Kenneth Matsumara's work on the BAL led it to be named an invention of the year by Time magazine in 2001. Liver cells obtained from an animal were used instead of developing a piece of equipment for each function of the liver. The structure and function of the first device also resembles that of today's BALs. Animal liver cells are suspended in a solution and a patient's blood is processed by a semipermeable membrane that allow toxins and blood proteins to pass but restricts an immunological response.

==== Development ====
Advancements in bioengineering techniques in the decade after Matsumara's work have led to improved membranes and hepatocyte attachment systems. Cell sources now include primary porcine hepatocytes, primary human hepatocytes, human hepatoblastoma (C3A), immortalized human cell lines and stem cells.

=== Use ===
The purpose of BAL-type devices is not to permanently replace liver functions, but to serve as a supportive device, either allowing the liver to regenerate properly upon acute liver failure, or to bridge the individual's liver functions until a transplant is possible.

=== Function ===
BALs are essentially bioreactors, with embedded hepatocytes (liver cells) that perform the functions of a normal liver. They process oxygenated blood plasma, which is separated from the other blood constituents. Several types of BALs are being developed, including hollow fiber systems and flat membrane sheet systems.

Various types of hepatocytes are used in these devices. Porcine hepatocytes are often used due to ease of acquisition and cost; however, they are relatively unstable and carry the risk of cross-species disease transmission. Primary human hepatocytes sourced from donor organs present several problems in their cost and difficulty to obtain, especially with the current lack in transplantable tissue. In addition, questions have been raised about tissue collected from patients transmitting malignancy or infection via the BAL device. Several lines of human hepatocytes are also used in BAL devices, including C3A and HepG2 tumour cell lines, but due to their origin from hepatomas, they possess the potential to pass on malignancy to the patient. There is ongoing research into the cultivation of new types of human hepatocytes capable of improved longevity and efficacy in a bioreactor over currently used cell types, that do not pose the risk of transfer of malignancy or infection, such as the HepZ cell line created by Werner et al..

==== Hollow fibre systems ====
Similar to kidney dialysis, hollow fiber systems employ a hollow fiber cartridge. Hepatocytes are suspended in a gel solution such as collagen, which is injected into a series of hollow fibers. In the case of collagen, the suspension is then gelled within the fibers, usually by a temperature change. The hepatocytes then contract the gel by their attachment to the collagen matrix, reducing the volume of the suspension and creating a flow space within the fibers. Nutrient media is circulated through the fibers to sustain the cells. During use, plasma is removed from the patients blood. The patient's plasma is fed into the space surrounding the fibers. The fibers, which are composed of a semi-permeable membrane, facilitate transfer of toxins, nutrients and other chemicals between the blood and the suspended cells. The membrane also keeps immune bodies, such as immunoglobulins, from passing to the cells to prevent an immune system rejection.

==== Cryogel-Based Systems ====
Currently, hollow-fibre bioreactors are the most commonly accepted design for clinical use due to their capillary-network allowing for easy perfusion of plasma across cell populations. However, these structures have their limitations, with convectional transport issues, nutritional gradients, non-uniform seeding, inefficient immobilisation of cells, and reduced hepatocyte growth restricting their effectiveness in BAL designs. Researchers are now investigating the use of cryogels to replace hollow-fibres as the cell carrier components in BAL systems.

Cryogels are super-macroporous three-dimensional polymers prepared at sub-zero temperatures, by the freezing of a solution of cryogel precursors and solvent. The pores develop during this freezing process – as the cryogel solution cools, the solvent begins to form crystals. This causes the concentration of the cryogel precursors in the solution to increase, initiating the cryogelation process and forming the polymer walls. As the cryogel warms, the solvent crystals thaw, leaving cavities that form the pores. Cryogel pores range in size from 10-100 μm in size, forming an interconnected network that mimics a capillary system with a very large surface area to volume ratio, supporting large numbers of immobilised cells. Convection mediated transport is also supported by cryogels, enabling even distribution of nutrients and metabolite elimination, overcoming some of the shortcomings of hollow-fibre systems. Cryogel scaffolds demonstrate good mechanical strength and biocompatibility without triggering an immune response, improving their potential for long-term inclusion in BAL devices or in-vitro use. Another advantage of cryogels is their flexibility for use in a variety of tasks, including separation and purification of substances, along with acting as extracellular matrix for cell growth and proliferation. Immobilisation of specific ligands onto cryogels enables adsorption of specific substances, supporting their use as treatment options for toxins, for separation of haemoglobin from blood, and as a localised and sustained method for drug delivery.

== Liver dialysis ==
Artificial liver support systems are aimed to temporarily replace native liver detoxification functions and they use albumin as scavenger molecule to clear the toxins involved in the physiopathology of the failing liver. Most of the toxins that accumulate in the plasma of patients with liver insufficiency are protein bound, and therefore conventional renal dialysis techniques, such as hemofiltration, hemodialysis or hemodiafiltration are not able to adequately eliminate them.

Liver dialysis has shown promise for patients with hepatorenal syndrome. It is similar to hemodialysis and based on the same principles, but hemodialysis does not remove toxins bound to albumin that accumulate in liver failure. Like a bioartificial liver device, it is a form of artificial extracorporeal liver support.

A critical issue of the clinical syndrome in liver failure is the accumulation of toxins not cleared by the failing liver. Based on this hypothesis, the removal of lipophilic, albumin-bound substances such as bilirubin, bile acids, metabolites of aromatic amino acids, medium-chain fatty acids and cytokines should be beneficial to the clinical course of a patient in liver failure. This led to the development of artificial filtration and absorption devices.

Liver dialysis is performed by physicians and surgeons and specialized nurses with training in gastroenterological medicine and surgery, namely, in hepatology, alongside their colleagues in the intensive or critical care unit and the transplantation department, which is responsible for procuring and implanting a new liver, or a part (lobe) of one, if and when it becomes available in time and the patient is eligible. Because of the need for these experts, as well as the relative newness of the procedure in certain areas, it is usually available only in larger hospitals, such as level I trauma center teaching hospitals connected with medical schools.

Between the different albumin dialysis modalities, single pass albumin dialysis (SPAD) has shown some positive results at a very high cost; it has been proposed that lowering the concentration of albumin in the dialysate does not seem to affect the detoxification capability of the procedure. Nevertheless, the most widely used systems today are based on hemodialysis and adsorption. These systems use conventional dialysis methods with an albumin containing dialysate that is later regenerated by means of adsorption columns, filled with activated charcoal and ion exchange resins. At present, there are two artificial extracorporeal liver support systems: the Molecular Adsorbents Recirculating System (MARS) from Gambro and Fractionated Plasma Separation and Adsorption (FPSA), commercialised as Prometheus (PROM) from Fresenius Medical Care. Of the two therapies, MARS is the most frequently studied, and clinically used system to date.

=== Prognosis/survival ===
Liver dialysis is currently only considered to be a bridge to transplantation or liver regeneration (in the case of acute liver failure) and, unlike kidney dialysis (for kidney failure), cannot support a patient for an extended period of time (months to years).

== See also ==
- American Society for Artificial Internal Organs
- Tissue engineering
