= Splanchnic =

Splanchnic is usually used to describe organs in the abdominal cavity.

It is used when describing:

- Splanchnic tissue
- Splanchnic organs: the stomach, small intestine, large intestine, pancreas, spleen, and liver; may also include the kidney.
- Splanchnic nerves
- Splanchnic mesoderm
- Splanchnic circulation – the circulation of the gastrointestinal tract originating at the celiac trunk, the superior mesenteric artery and the inferior mesenteric artery.

== History and etymology ==
The term derives from Ancient Greek: σπλαγχνικός, romanized: splanchnikos, meaning "inward parts, organs".

The term "splanchnologia" is used for grouping in Nomina Anatomica, but not in Terminologia Anatomica. It includes most of the structures usually considered "internal organs", but not all (for example, the heart is excluded).
