= Ornipressin =

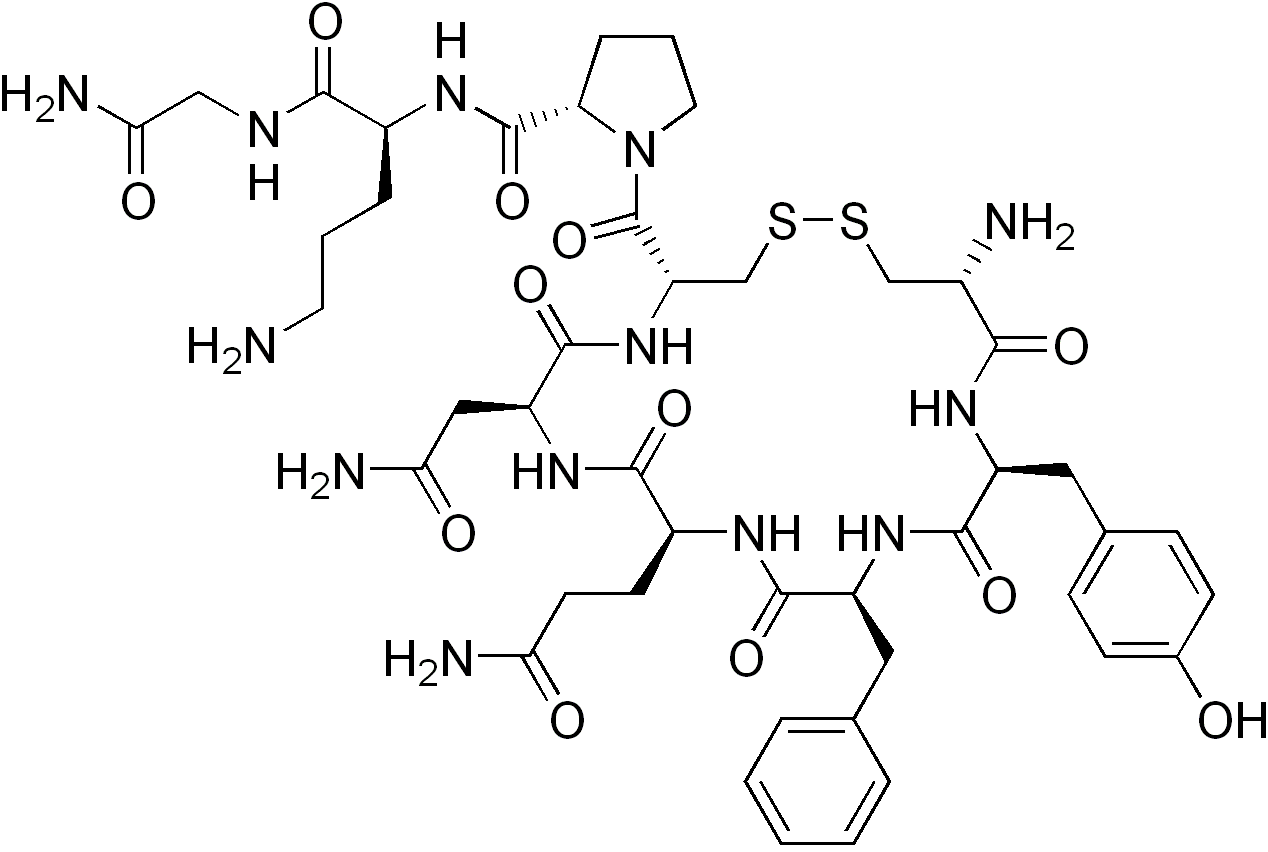

Names
- IUPAC name (2S)-N-[(2S)-5-Amino-1-[(2-amino-2-oxoethyl)amino]- 1-oxopentan-2-yl]-1-[(4R,7S,10S,13S,16S,19R)- 19-amino-7-(2-amino-2-oxoethyl)-10-(3-amino-3-oxopropyl)-16-[(4-hydroxyphenyl)methyl] -6,9,12,15,18-pentaoxo-13-(phenylmethyl)1,2-dithia-5,8,11,14,17- pentazacycloicosane-4-carbonyl]pyrrolidine-2-carboxamide

Identifiers
CAS Number	3397-23-7
3D model (JSmol)	Interactive image
ChemSpider	16736525
ECHA InfoCard	100.020.231
MeSH	Ornipressin
PubChem CID	14257660
UNII	1KTH6N080W
CompTox Dashboard (EPA)	DTXSID101021593
- InChI: InChI=1S/C45H63N13O12S2/c46-16-4-8-28(39(64)51-21-37(50)62)53-44(69)34-9-5-17-58(34)45(70)33-23-72-71-22-27(47)38(63)54-30(19-25-10-12-26(59)13-11-25)42(67)55-31(18-24-6-2-1-3-7-24)41(66)52-29(14-15-35(48)60)40(65)56-32(20-36(49)61)43(68)57-33/h1-3,6-7,10-13,27-34,59H,4-5,8-9,14-23,46-47H2,(H2,48,60)(H2,49,61)(H2,50,62)(H,51,64)(H,52,66)(H,53,69)(H,54,63)(H,55,67)(H,56,65)(H,57,68)/t27-,28-,29-,30-,31-,32-,33-,34-/m0/s1 Key: MUNMIGOEDGHVLE-LGYYRGKSSA-N; InChI=1/C45H63N13O12S2/c46-16-4-8-28(39(64)51-21-37(50)62)53-44(69)34-9-5-17-58(34)45(70)33-23-72-71-22-27(47)38(63)54-30(19-25-10-12-26(59)13-11-25)42(67)55-31(18-24-6-2-1-3-7-24)41(66)52-29(14-15-35(48)60)40(65)56-32(20-36(49)61)43(68)57-33/h1-3,6-7,10-13,27-34,59H,4-5,8-9,14-23,46-47H2,(H2,48,60)(H2,49,61)(H2,50,62)(H,51,64)(H,52,66)(H,53,69)(H,54,63)(H,55,67)(H,56,65)(H,57,68)/t27-,28-,29-,30-,31-,32-,33-,34-/m0/s1 Key: MUNMIGOEDGHVLE-LGYYRGKSBZ
- SMILES: NC(=O)CNC(=O)[C@H](CCCN)NC(=O)[C@@H]1CCCN1C(=O)[C@H]4NC(=O)[C@@H](NC(=O)[C@H](CCC(N)=O)NC(=O)[C@H](Cc2ccccc2)NC(=O)[C@H](Cc3ccc(O)cc3)NC(=O)[C@@H](N)CSSC4)CC(N)=O

Properties
Chemical formula	C_{45}H_{63}N_{13}O_{12}S_{2}
Molar mass	1042.19 g/mol

Pharmacology
ATC code	H01BA05 (WHO)
- Except where otherwise noted, data are given for materials in their standard state (at 25 °C [77 °F], 100 kPa). verify (what is ?) Infobox references

Ornipressin is a vasoconstrictor, haemostatic and renal agent.
