= Spontaneous bacterial peritonitis =

- Specialty: Gastroenterology

Spontaneous bacterial peritonitis (SBP) is the development of a bacterial infection in the peritoneum, despite the absence of an obvious source for the infection. It is specifically an infection of the ascitic fluid – an increased volume of peritoneal fluid. Ascites is most commonly a complication of cirrhosis of the liver. It can also occur in patients with nephrotic syndrome. SBP has a high mortality rate.

The diagnosis of SBP requires paracentesis, a sampling of the peritoneal fluid taken from the peritoneal cavity. If the fluid contains large numbers of white blood cells known as neutrophils (>250 cells/μL), infection is confirmed and antibiotics will be given, without waiting for culture results. In addition to antibiotics, infusions of albumin are usually administered.

Other life-threatening complications such as kidney malfunction and increased liver insufficiency can be triggered by spontaneous bacterial peritonitis. 30% of SBP patients develop kidney malfunction, one of the strongest predictors for mortality. Where there are signs of this development albumin infusion will also be given.

Spontaneous fungal peritonitis (SFP) can also occur and this can sometimes accompany a bacterial infection.

== Signs and symptoms ==
Signs and symptoms of spontaneous bacterial peritonitis (SBP) include fevers, chills, nausea, vomiting, abdominal pain and tenderness, general malaise, altered mental status, and worsening ascites. Thirteen percent of patients have no signs or symptoms. In cases of acute or chronic liver failure SBP is one of the main triggers for hepatic encephalopathy, and where there is no other clear causal indication for this, SBP may be suspected.

These symptoms can also be the same for a spontaneous fungal peritonitis (SFP) and therefore make a differentiation difficult. Delay of diagnosis can delay antifungal treatment and lead to a higher mortality rate.

== Causes ==
SBP is most commonly caused by Gram-negative E. coli, followed by Klebsiella. Common Gram-positive bacteria identified include species of Streptococcus, Staphylococcus, and Enterococcus. The percentage of gram-positive bacteria responsible has been increasing.

A spontaneous fungal infection can often follow a spontaneous bacterial infection that has been treated with antibiotics. The use of antibiotics can result in an excessive growth of fungi in the gut flora which can then translocate into the peritoneal cavity. Although fungi are much larger than bacteria, the increased intestinal permeability resulting from advanced cirrhosis makes their translocation easier. SFP is mostly caused by species of Candida and most commonly by Candida albicans.

== Pathophysiology ==
H_{2} antagonists and proton-pump inhibitors are medications that decrease or suppress the secretion of acid by the stomach. Their use in treating cirrhosis is associated with the development of SBP. Bacterial translocation is thought to be the key mechanism for the development of SBP. Small intestinal bacterial overgrowth which may be implicated in this translocation, is found in a large percentage of those with cirrhosis. With respect to compromised host defenses, patients with severe acute or chronic liver disease are often deficient in complement and may also have malfunctioning of the neutrophilic and reticuloendothelial systems.

As for the significance of ascitic fluid proteins, it was demonstrated that cirrhotic patients with ascitic protein concentrations below 1 g/dL were 10 times more likely to develop SBP than individuals with higher concentrations. It is thought that the antibacterial, or opsonic, activity of ascitic fluid is closely correlated with the protein concentration. Additional studies have confirmed the validity of the ascitic fluid protein concentration as the best predictor of the first episode of SBP.

In nephrotic syndrome, SBP can frequently affect children but only very rarely can it affect adults.

== Diagnosis ==
Infection of the peritoneum causes an inflammatory reaction with a subsequent increase in the number of neutrophils in the fluid. Diagnosis is made by paracentesis (needle aspiration of the ascitic fluid); SBP is diagnosed if the fluid contains neutrophils at greater than 250 cells per mm^{3} (equals a cell count of 250 × 10^{6}/L) fluid in the absence of another reason for this (such as inflammation of one of the internal organs or a perforation).

The fluid is also cultured to identify bacteria. If the sample is sent in a plain sterile container, 40% of samples will identify an organism, while if the sample is sent in a bottle with culture medium, the sensitivity increases to 72–90%.

== Prevention ==
All people with cirrhosis might benefit from antibiotics (oral fluoroquinolone norfloxacin) if:

- Ascitic fluid protein <1.0 g/dL. Patients with fluid protein <15 g/L and either Child–Pugh score of at least 9 or impaired renal function may also benefit.
- Previous SBP

People with cirrhosis admitted to the hospital should receive prophylactic antibiotics if:

- They have bleeding esophageal varices

Studies on the use of rifaximin in cirrhotic patients, have suggested that its use may be effective in preventing spontaneous bacterial peritonitis.

== Treatment ==
=== Antibiotics ===
Although there is no high-quality evidence, the third-generation cephalosporins are considered the standard empirical treatment for spontaneous bacterial peritonitis in people with cirrhosis.

Other resources mentioned that empiric third-generation cephalosporins are recommended for suspected SBP with a Polymorphonuclear neutrophils (PMN) count over 250 cells/μL. The exception was that if in cases of prior beta-lactam use or hospital-acquired infections, the treatment should be guided by susceptibility testing. Patients with a PMN count above 500 cells/μL require hospitalization and antibiotics, with follow-up ascitic fluid analysis. Lack of improvement within 48 hours may indicate secondary bacterial peritonitis, potentially requiring surgery. A PMN reduction of at least 25% suggests an adequate response to treatment.

In practice, cefotaxime is the agent of choice for treatment of SBP. After confirmation of SBP, hospital admission is usually advised for observation and intravenous antibiotic therapy.

Where there is a risk of kidney malfunction developing in a syndrome called hepatorenal syndrome, intravenous albumin is usually administered too. Paracentesis may be repeated after 48 hours to ensure control of infection. After recovery from a single episode of SBP, indefinite prophylactic antibiotics are recommended.

=== Prokinetics ===
The addition of a prokinetic drug to an antibiotic regimen reduces the incidence of spontaneous bacterial peritonitis possibly via decreasing small intestinal bacterial overgrowth.

=== Intravenous albumin ===
A randomized controlled trial found that intravenous albumin on the day of admission and on hospital day 3 can reduce kidney impairment.

== Prognosis ==
With proper treatment, infection-related mortality in SBP is low, but outcomes worsen if sepsis develops. In hospitals, non-infection-related mortality can reach 20–40%, while one- and two-year mortality rates are approximately 70% and 80%, respectively.

== Complications ==
There are complications associated with SBP such as:

- Renal failure
- Sepsis
- Liver failure/insufficiency
- Tense ascites
- Bleeding after paracentesis
- Bowel perforation after paracentesis
- Spontaneous fungal peritonitis.

== Epidemiology ==
Patients with ascites underwent routine paracentesis; the incidence of active SBP ranged from 10% to 27% at the time of hospital admission.

== History ==
SBP was first described in 1964 by Harold O. Conn.
