= Terlipressin =

Chemical compound

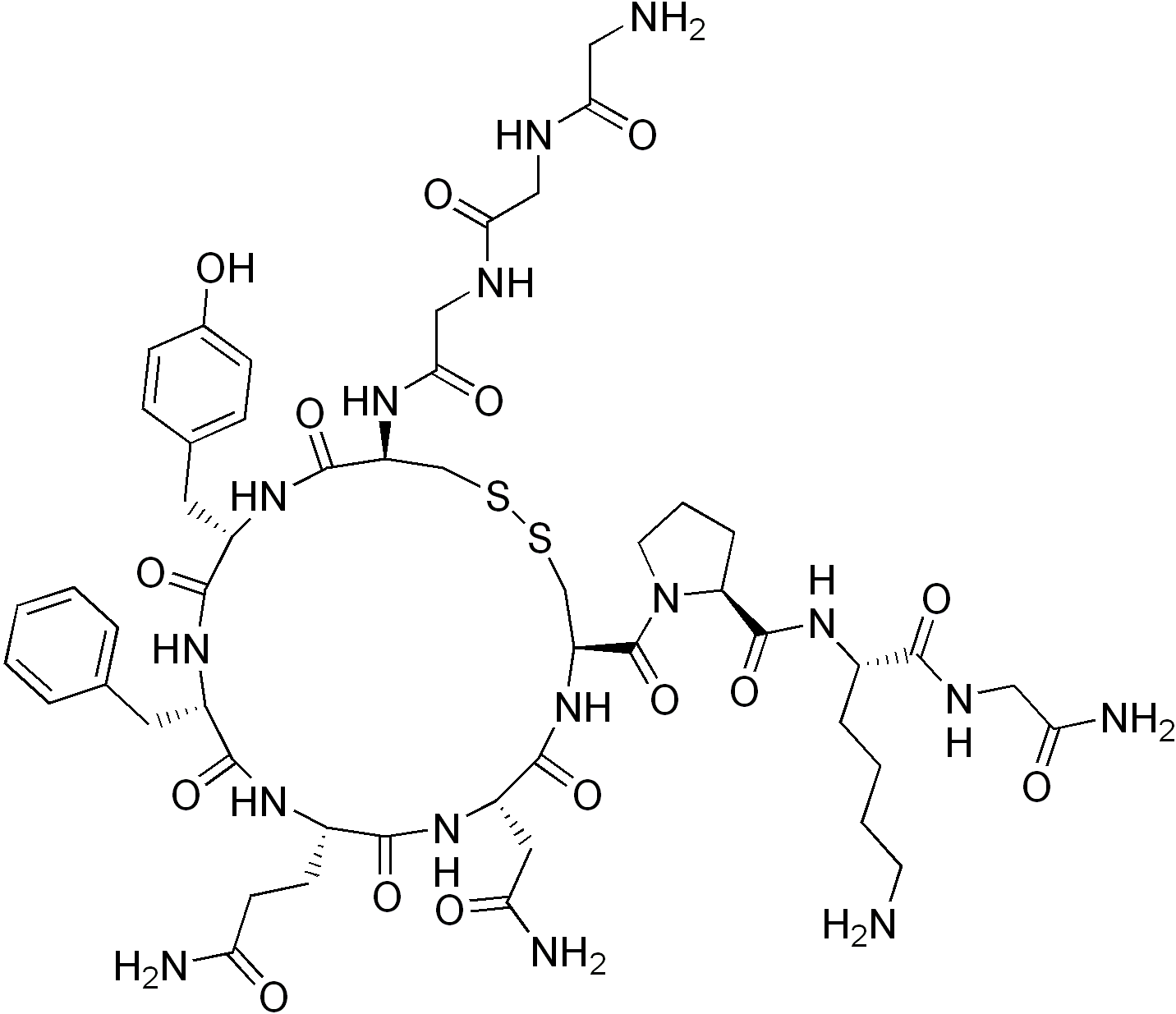

Clinical data
- Trade names: Terlivaz
- AHFS/Drugs.com: International Drug Names
- Routes of administration: Intravenous
- ATC code: H01BA04 (WHO)

Legal status
- Legal status: US: ℞-only

Pharmacokinetic data
- Protein binding: ~30%

Identifiers
- IUPAC name: 1-{[(4R,7S,10S,13S,16S,19R)-19-{[({[(aminoacetyl)amino]acetyl}amino)acetyl]amino}-7-(2-amino-2-oxoethyl)-10-(3-amino-3-oxopropyl)-13-benzyl-16-(4-hydroxybenzyl)-6,9,12,15,18-pentaoxo-1,2-dithia-5,8,11,14,17-pentaazacycloicosan-4-yl]carbonyl}-L-prolyl-N-(2-amino-2-oxoethyl)-L-lysinamide
- CAS Number: 14636-12-5
- PubChem CID: 72081
- DrugBank: DB02638
- ChemSpider: 65067
- UNII: 7Z5X49W53P
- KEGG: D06672
- CompTox Dashboard (EPA): DTXSID7048952
- ECHA InfoCard: 100.035.149

Chemical and physical data
- Formula: C_{52}H_{74}N_{16}O_{15}S_{2}
- Molar mass: 1227.38 g·mol^{−1}
- 3D model (JSmol): Interactive image
- SMILES: O=C(N)CNC(=O)[C@@H](NC(=O)[C@H]4N(C(=O)[C@H]1NC(=O)[C@@H](NC(=O)[C@@H](NC(=O)[C@@H](NC(=O)[C@@H](NC(=O)[C@@H](NC(=O)CNC(=O)CNC(=O)CN)CSSC1)Cc2ccc(O)cc2)Cc3ccccc3)CCC(=O)N)CC(=O)N)CCC4)CCCCN
- InChI: InChI=1S/C52H74N16O15S2/c53-17-5-4-9-31(45(76)60-23-41(57)72)63-51(82)38-10-6-18-68(38)52(83)37-27-85-84-26-36(61-44(75)25-59-43(74)24-58-42(73)22-54)50(81)65-34(20-29-11-13-30(69)14-12-29)48(79)64-33(19-28-7-2-1-3-8-28)47(78)62-32(15-16-39(55)70)46(77)66-35(21-40(56)71)49(80)67-37/h1-3,7-8,11-14,31-38,69H,4-6,9-10,15-27,53-54H2,(H2,55,70)(H2,56,71)(H2,57,72)(H,58,73)(H,59,74)(H,60,76)(H,61,75)(H,62,78)(H,63,82)(H,64,79)(H,65,81)(H,66,77)(H,67,80)/t31-,32-,33-,34-,35-,36-,37-,38-/m0/s1; Key:BENFXAYNYRLAIU-QSVFAHTRSA-N

Terlipressin, sold under the brand name Terlivaz among others, is an analogue of vasopressin used as a vasoactive drug in the management of low blood pressure. It has been found to be effective when norepinephrine does not help. Terlipressin is a vasopressin receptor agonist.

Terlipressin was approved for medical use in the United States in 2022. The US Food and Drug Administration (FDA) considers it to be a first-in-class medication.

== Medical uses ==
Terlipressin is indicated to improve kidney function in adults with hepatorenal syndrome with rapid reduction in kidney function.

Indications for use include norepinephrine-resistant septic shock although, 2021 Surviving Sepsis Guidelines recommend against its use for adults with septic shock and hepatorenal syndrome. In addition, it is used to treat bleeding esophageal varices.

== Contraindications ==
Terlipressin is contraindicated in people experiencing hypoxia or worsening respiratory symptoms and in people with ongoing coronary, peripheral or mesenteric ischemia. Terlipressin may cause fetal harm when used during pregnancy.

== Society and culture ==
Terlipressin is available in United States, New Zealand, Australia, the European Union, India, Indonesia, Pakistan, UAE. It is sold under various brand names including Glypressin and Terlivaz.
