= Ascites =

Abnormal build-up of fluid in the abdomen

- Other names: Peritoneal cavity fluid, peritoneal fluid excess, hydroperitoneum, abdominal dropsy
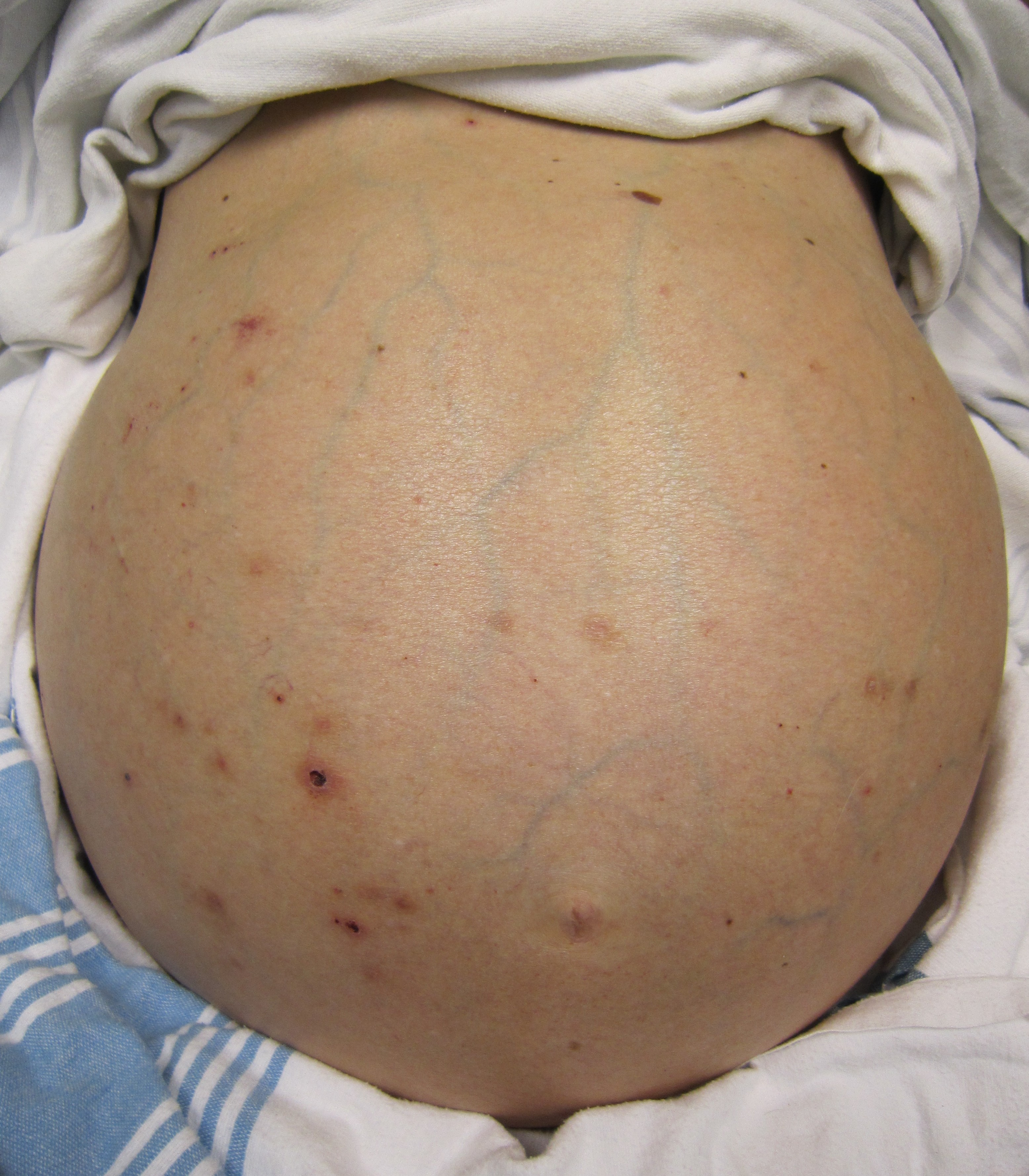
- The abdomen of a person with cirrhosis that has resulted in massive ascites and prominent superficial veins
- Pronunciation: /əˈsaɪtiːz/, ə-SY-teez
- Specialty: Gastroenterology, general surgery
- Symptoms: Increased abdominal size, increased weight, abdominal discomfort, shortness of breath
- Complications: Spontaneous bacterial peritonitis, hepatorenal syndrome, low blood sodium
- Causes: Liver cirrhosis, cancer, heart failure, tuberculosis, pancreatitis, blockage of the hepatic vein
- Diagnostic method: Physical exam, ultrasound, CT scan
- Treatment: Low-salt diet, medications, draining the fluid
- Medication: Spironolactone, furosemide
- Frequency: >50% of people with cirrhosis

Ascites (/əˈsaɪtiz/; from Greek ἀσκός (askos) 'bag, sac') is the abnormal build-up of fluid in the abdomen. Technically, it is more than 25 millilitres (0.88 imp fl oz; 0.85 US fl oz) of fluid in the peritoneal cavity, although volumes greater than one litre (0.22 imp gal; 0.26 US gal) may occur. Symptoms may include increased abdominal size, increased weight, abdominal discomfort, and shortness of breath. Complications can include spontaneous bacterial peritonitis.

In the developed world, the most common cause is liver cirrhosis, whose underlying mechanism involves high blood pressure in the portal system and dysfunction of blood vessels. Other causes include cancer, heart failure, tuberculosis, pancreatitis, and blockage of the hepatic vein. Diagnosis is typically based on an examination together with ultrasound or a CT scan. Testing the fluid can help in determining the underlying cause.

Treatment often involves a low-salt diet, medication such as diuretics, and draining the fluid. A transjugular intrahepatic portosystemic shunt (TIPS) may be placed but is associated with complications. Attempts to treat the underlying cause, such as by a liver transplant, may be considered. Of those with cirrhosis, more than half develop ascites in the ten years following diagnosis. Of those in this group who develop ascites, half will die within three years.

== Etymology ==
The Latin ascites, originally from Greek (askites [ασκίτης]), meant "bag-like dropsy," from askós (ἀσκός), a leather bag or sheepskin ("wineskin") used for carrying wine, water or oil.

== Signs and symptoms ==
Mild ascites is hard to notice, but severe ascites leads to abdominal distension. People with ascites generally will complain of progressive abdominal heaviness and pressure as well as shortness of breath due to mechanical impingement on the diaphragm.

Ascites is detected with physical examination of the abdomen by visible bulging of the flanks in the reclining person ("flank bulging"), "shifting dullness" (difference in percussion note in the flanks that shifts when the person is turned on the side), or in massive ascites, with a "fluid thrill" or "fluid wave" (tapping or pushing on one side will generate a wave-like effect through the fluid that can be felt in the opposite side of the abdomen).

Other signs of ascites may be present due to its underlying cause. For instance, in portal hypertension (perhaps due to cirrhosis or fibrosis of the liver) people may also complain of leg swelling, bruising, gynecomastia, hematemesis, or mental changes due to encephalopathy. Those with ascites due to cancer (peritoneal carcinomatosis) may complain of chronic fatigue or weight loss. Those with ascites due to heart failure may also complain of shortness of breath as well as wheezing and exercise intolerance.

== Causes ==
Causes of high serum-ascites albumin gradient (SAAG or transudate) are:

- Cirrhosis – 81% (alcoholic in 65%, viral in 10%, cryptogenic in 6%)
- Heart failure – 3%
- Hepatic venous occlusion: Budd–Chiari syndrome or veno-occlusive disease
- Constrictive pericarditis
- Kwashiorkor (childhood protein-energy malnutrition)

Causes of low SAAG ("exudate") are

- Cancer (metastasis and primary peritoneal carcinomatosis) – 10%
- Infection: Tuberculosis – 2% or spontaneous bacterial peritonitis
- Pancreatitis – 1%
- Serositis
- Nephrotic syndrome
- Hereditary angioedema

== Diagnosis ==
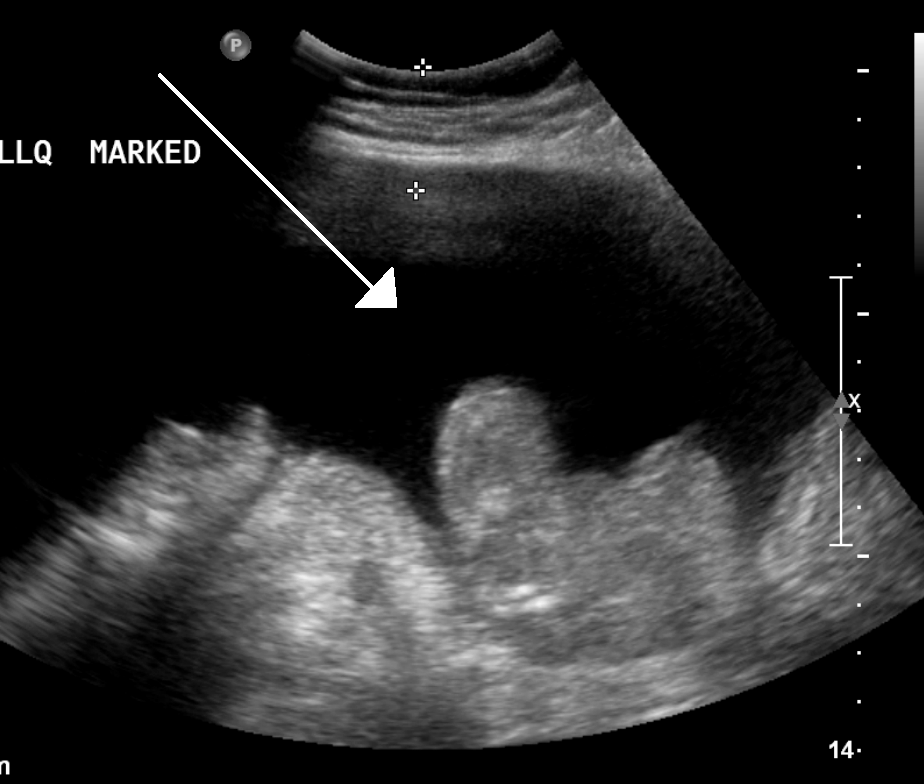
Ascites in a person with abdominal cancer as seen on ultrasound

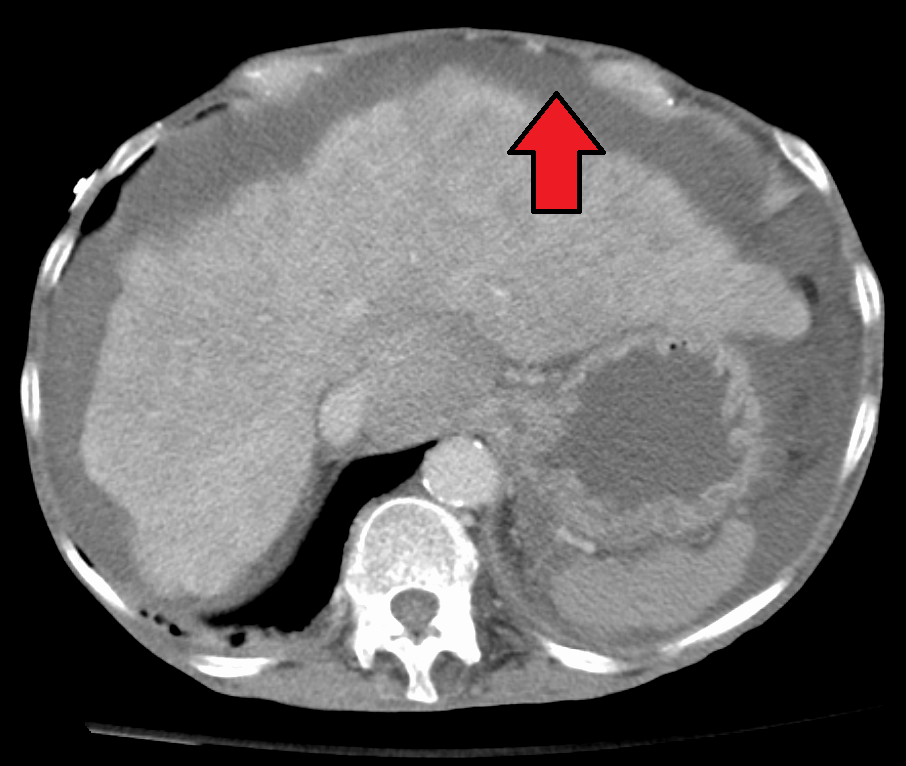
Liver cirrhosis with ascites

Routine complete blood count (CBC), basic metabolic profile, liver enzymes, and coagulation should be performed. Most experts recommend diagnostic paracentesis if the ascites is new or if the person with ascites is being admitted to the hospital. The fluid is then reviewed for its gross appearance, protein level, albumin, and cell counts (red and white). Additional tests will be performed if indicated such as microbiological culture, Gram stain, and cytopathology.

The serum-ascites albumin gradient (SAAG) is probably a better discriminant than older measures (transudate versus exudate) for the causes of ascites. A high gradient (> 1.1 g/dL) indicates the ascites is due to portal hypertension. A low gradient (< 1.1 g/dL) indicates ascites of non-portal hypertensive as a cause.

Ultrasound investigation is often done before attempts to remove fluid from the abdomen. This may reveal the size and shape of the abdominal organs, and Doppler studies may show the direction of flow in the portal vein, as well as detecting Budd–Chiari syndrome (thrombosis of the hepatic vein) and portal vein thrombosis. The sonographer also can estimate the amount of ascitic fluid, and difficult-to-drain ascites may be drained under ultrasound guidance. An abdominal CT scan is more accurate than a sonogram to reveal abdominal organ structure and morphology.

=== Classification ===
Uncomplicated ascites is characterized by receding or nonrecurring ascites post-paracentesis, and is treatable with diet control and diuretic treatment. Refractory ascites is characterized as ascites that recurs or does not recede post-paracentesis, despite diet control and diuretic treatment.

Uncomplicated ascites is more common, responsive to treatment, and exists in three grades:

- Grade 1: mild, only visible on ultrasound and CT
- Grade 2: detectable with flank bulging and shifting dullness
- Grade 3: directly visible, confirmed with the fluid wave test

Refractory ascites is less common, difficult to treat, and exists in two subtypes: i) diuretic intractable ascites makes up the majority of refractory ascites cases, where diuretic treatment is difficult due to diuretic-induced complications such as elevated creatinine and hypokalemia; ii) diuretic resistant ascites does not respond to diuretic treatment.

== Pathophysiology ==
Ascitic fluid can accumulate as a transudate or an exudate. Amounts of up to 35 liters are possible.

Roughly, transudates are a result of increased pressure in the hepatic portal vein (>8 mmHg, usually around 20 mmHg (e.g., due to cirrhosis), while exudates are actively secreted fluid due to inflammation or malignancy. As a result, exudates are high in protein and lactate dehydrogenase and have a low pH (<7.30), a low glucose level, and more white blood cells. Transudates have low protein (<30 g/L), low LDH, high pH, normal glucose, and fewer than 1 white cell per 1000 mm^{3}. Clinically, the most useful measure is the difference between ascitic and serum albumin concentrations. A difference of less than 1 g/dl (10 g/L) implies an exudate.

Portal hypertension plays an important role in the production of ascites by raising capillary hydrostatic pressure within the splanchnic bed.

Regardless of the cause, sequestration of fluid within the abdomen leads to additional fluid retention by the kidneys due to stimulatory effect on blood pressure hormones, notably aldosterone. The sympathetic nervous system is also activated, and renin production is increased due to decreased perfusion of the kidney. Extreme disruption of the renal blood flow can lead to hepatorenal syndrome. Other complications of ascites include spontaneous bacterial peritonitis (SBP), due to decreased antibacterial factors in the ascitic fluid such as complement.

== Treatment ==
Diagram showing ascites being drained

Ascites is generally treated while an underlying cause is sought, in order to relieve symptoms and to prevent complications and progression. In people with mild ascites, therapy is usually as an outpatient. The goal is weight loss of no more than 1.0 kg/day for people with both ascites and peripheral edema and no more than 0.5 kg/day for people with ascites alone. In those with severe ascites causing a tense abdomen, hospitalization is generally necessary for paracentesis.

=== High serum-ascites albumin gradient (transudative) ascites ===
==== Diet ====
Salt restriction is the initial treatment, which allows diuresis (production of urine) since the person now has more fluid than salt concentration. Salt restriction is effective in about 15% of these people. Water restriction is needed if serum sodium levels drop below 130 mmol L^{−1}.

==== Diuretics ====
Because salt restriction is the basic concept in treatment, and aldosterone is one of the hormones that increase salt retention, a medication that counteracts aldosterone should be sought. Spironolactone (or other distal-tubule diuretics, such as triamterene and amiloride) is the drug of choice, because it blocks the aldosterone receptor in the collecting tubule. This choice has been confirmed in a randomized controlled trial. Diuretics for ascites should be taken once a day. Generally, the starting dose is oral spironolactone 100 mg/day (max 400 mg/day). 40% of people will respond to spironolactone. For nonresponders, a loop diuretic may also be added and generally, furosemide is added at a dose of 40 mg/day (max 160 mg/day), or alternatively (bumetanide or torasemide). The ratio of 100:40 reduces risks of potassium imbalance. Serum potassium level and renal function should be monitored closely while the patient is on these medications.

Monitoring diuresis: Diuresis can be monitored by weighing the person daily. The goal is weight loss of no more than 1.0 kg/day for people with both ascites and peripheral edema and no more than 0.5 kg/day for people with ascites alone. If daily weights cannot be obtained, diuretics can also be guided by the urinary sodium concentration. Dosage is increased until a negative sodium balance occurs. A random urine sodium-to-potassium ratio of > 1 is 90% sensitivity in predicting negative balance (> 78-mmol/day sodium excretion).

Diuretic resistance: Diuretic resistance can be predicted by giving 80 mg intravenous furosemide after 3 days without diuretics and on an 80 mEq sodium/day diet. The urinary sodium excretion over 8 hours < 50 mEq/8 hours predicts resistance.

If the person exhibits a resistance or poor response to diuretic therapy, ultrafiltration or aquapheresis may be needed to achieve adequate control of fluid retention and congestion. The use of such mechanical methods of fluid removal can produce meaningful clinical benefits in people with diuretic resistance and may restore responsiveness to conventional doses of diuretics.

==== Paracentesis ====
In those with severe (tense) ascites, therapeutic paracentesis may be needed in addition to medical treatments listed above. As this may deplete serum albumin levels in the blood, albumin is generally administered intravenously in proportion to the amount of ascites removed.

==== Surgery ====
Ascites that is refractory to medical therapy is considered an indication for liver transplantation. In the United States, the MELD score is used to prioritize people for transplantation.

In a minority of people with advanced cirrhosis that have recurrent ascites, shunts may be used. Typical shunts used are the portacaval shunt, the peritoneovenous shunt, and the transjugular intrahepatic portosystemic shunt (TIPS). However, none of these has been shown to extend life expectancy, and they are considered to be bridges to liver transplantation. A 2006 meta-analysis concluded that "TIPS was more effective at removing ascites [than] paracentesis[,] without a significant difference in mortality, gastrointestinal bleeding, infection, and acute renal failure. However, TIPS patients develop hepatic encephalopathy significantly more often."

Another option for people with refractory or malignant ascites is the automated low-flow ascites pump (Alfapump), an implanted machine, which uses a pump to move ascites from the peritoneal cavity to the bladder for urination.

=== Low SAAG ("exudative") ascites ===
Exudative ascites generally does not respond to manipulation of the salt balance or diuretic therapy. Repeated paracentesis and treatment of the underlying cause is the mainstay of treatment.

== Society and culture ==
It has been suggested that ascites was seen as a punishment especially for oath-breakers among the Proto-Indo-Europeans. This proposal builds on the Hittite military oath as well as various Vedic hymns (RV 7.89, AVS 4.16.7). A similar curse dates to the Kassite dynasty (12th century BC).
