= 1719 =

1719 in various calendars
- Gregorian calendar: 1719; MDCCXIX
- Ab urbe condita: 2472
- Armenian calendar: 1168; ԹՎ ՌՃԿԸ
- Assyrian calendar: 6469
- Balinese saka calendar: 1640–1641
- Bengali calendar: 1125–1126
- Berber calendar: 2669
- British Regnal year: 5 Geo. 1 – 6 Geo. 1
- Buddhist calendar: 2263
- Burmese calendar: 1081
- Byzantine calendar: 7227–7228
- Chinese calendar: 戊戌年 (Earth Dog); 4416 or 4209 — to — 己亥年 (Earth Pig); 4417 or 4210
- Coptic calendar: 1435–1436
- Discordian calendar: 2885
- Ethiopian calendar: 1711–1712
- Hebrew calendar: 5479–5480
- Hindu calendars
- Vikram Samvat: 1775–1776
- Shaka Samvat: 1640–1641
- Kali Yuga: 4819–4820
- Holocene calendar: 11719
- Igbo calendar: 719–720
- Iranian calendar: 1097–1098
- Islamic calendar: 1131–1132
- Japanese calendar: Kyōhō 4 (享保４年)
- Javanese calendar: 1643–1644
- Julian calendar: Gregorian minus 11 days
- Korean calendar: 4052
- Minguo calendar: 193 before ROC 民前193年
- Nanakshahi calendar: 251
- Thai solar calendar: 2261–2262
- Tibetan calendar: ས་ཕོ་ཁྱི་ལོ་ (male Earth-Dog); 1845 or 1464 or 692 — to — ས་མོ་ཕག་ལོ་ (female Earth-Boar); 1846 or 1465 or 693

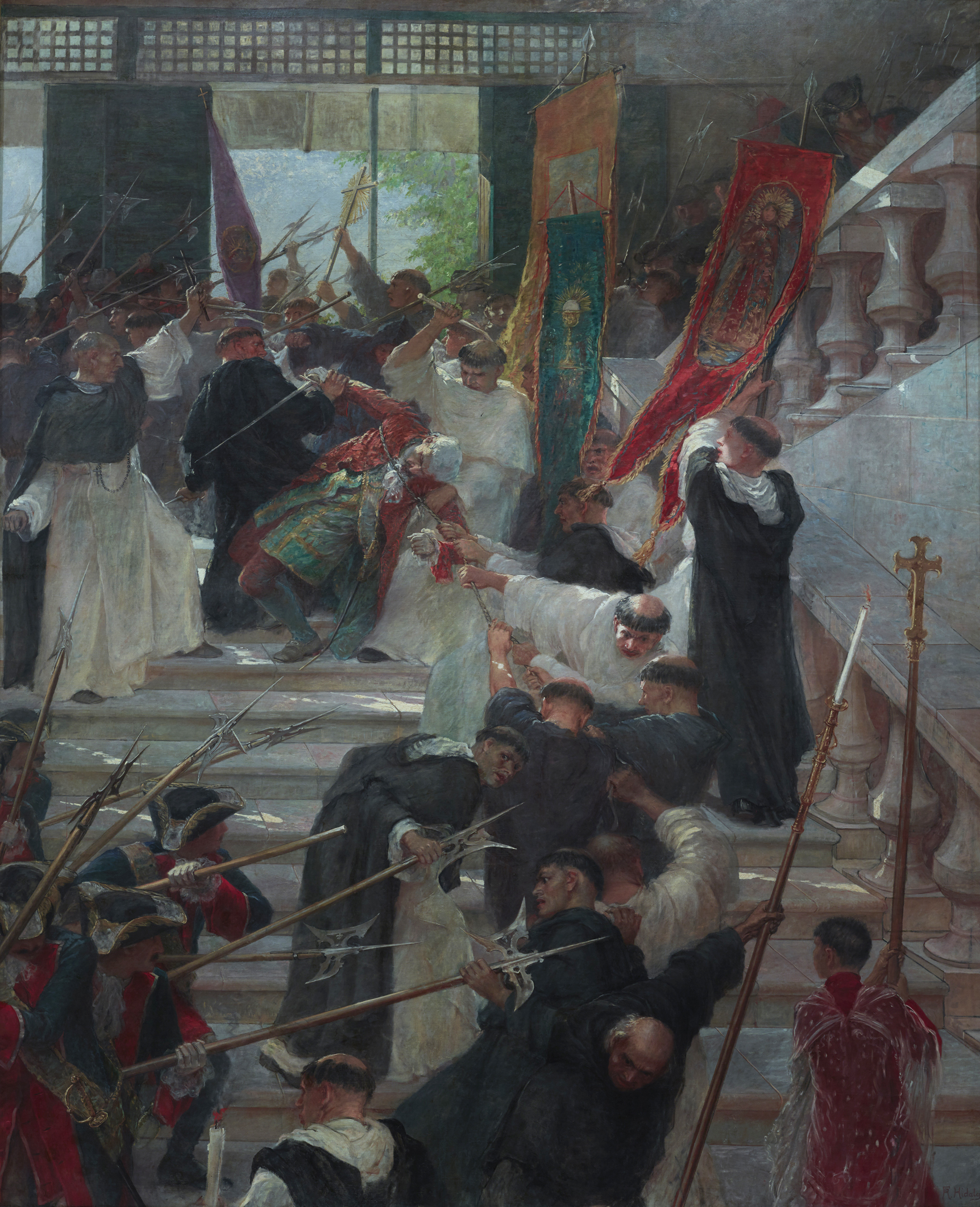
October 11: Philippine Governor-General Bustillo is assassinated. (1904 painting by Félix Resurrección Hidalgo)

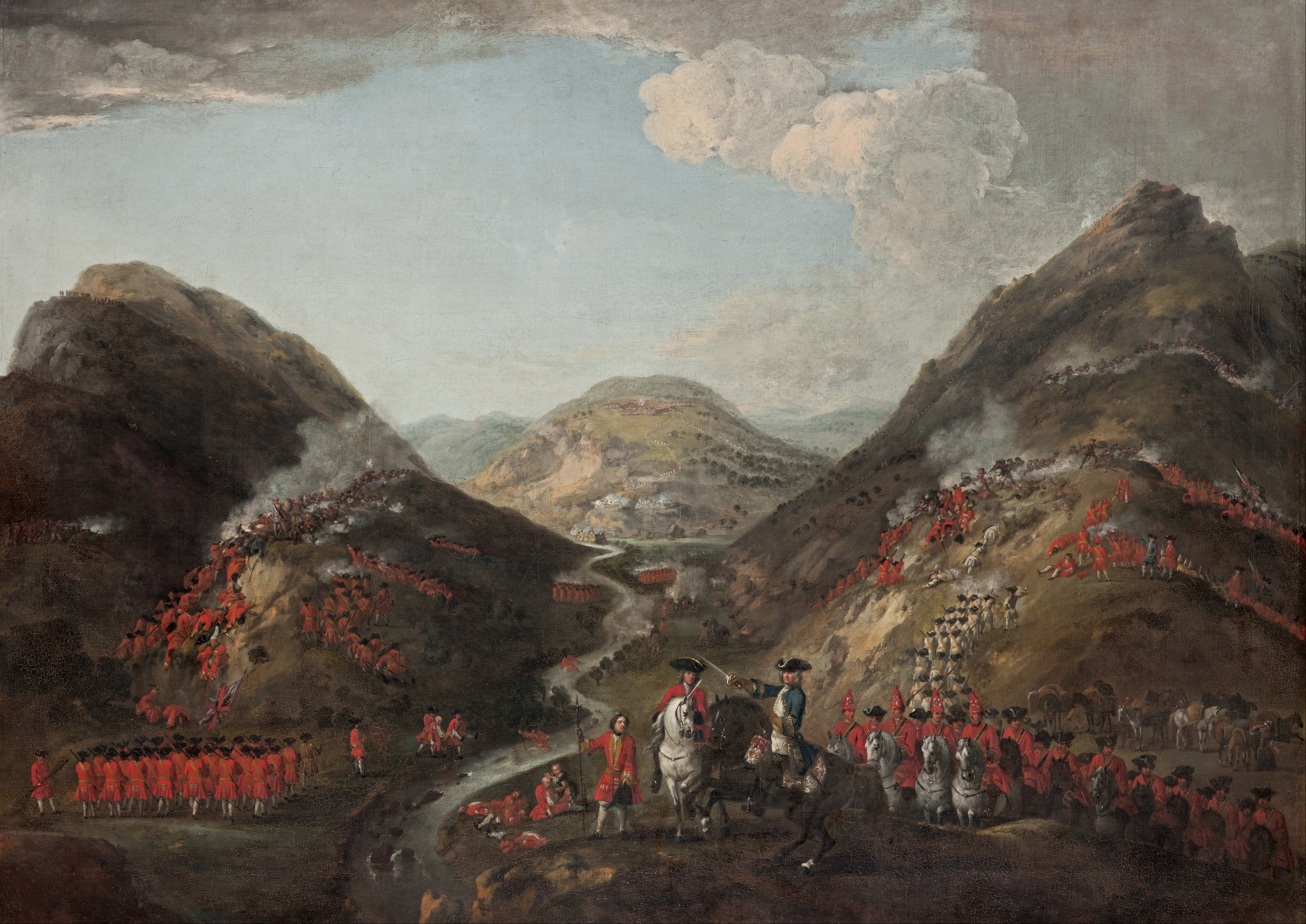
June 10: Battle of Glen Shiel.

1719 (MDCCXIX) was a common year starting on Sunday of the Gregorian calendar and a common year starting on Thursday of the Julian calendar, the 1719th year of the Common Era (CE) and Anno Domini (AD) designations, the 719th year of the 2nd millennium, the 19th year of the 18th century, and the 10th and last year of the 1710s decade. As of the start of 1719, the Gregorian calendar was 11 days ahead of the Julian calendar, which remained in localized use until 1923.

== Events ==
=== January–March ===
- January 8 – Carolean Death March begins: A catastrophic retreat by a largely-Finnish Swedish-Carolean army under the command of Carl Gustaf Armfeldt across the Tydalen mountains in a blizzard kills around 3,700 men and cripples a further 600 for life.
- January 23 – The Principality of Liechtenstein is created, within the Holy Roman Empire.
- February 3 (January 23 Old Style) – The Riksdag of the Estates (the parliament of Sweden) recognizes Ulrika Eleonora's claim to the Swedish throne, after she has agreed to sign a new Swedish constitution. Thus, she is recognized as queen regnant of Sweden.
- February 21 – The Riksdag of the Estates in Sweden adopts the Instrument of Government (1719), a constitution which (with slight amendment in 1720) introduces the "Age of Liberty" in the country; it includes limited women's suffrage.
- February 28 – Farrukhsiyar, the Mughal Emperor of India since 1713, is deposed by the Sayyid brothers, who install Rafi ud-Darajat in his place. In prison, Farrukhsiyar is strangled by assassins on April 19.
- March 6 – A serious earthquake (estimated magnitude >7) in El Salvador results in large fractures, liquefaction zones, and a sulphuric gas leak. It destroys houses, churches and monasteries.
- March 17 – The coronation of Ulrika Eleonora as Queen of Sweden takes place in Stockholm.

=== April–June ===
- April 4 – The French army under James FitzJames, 1st Duke of Berwick, invades the Basque provinces of Spain, with 20,000 troops crossing into Navarre.
- April 19 – In Louisiana (New France), Jean-Baptiste Le Moyne, Sieur de Bienville's brother Serigny arrives on a French man-of-war, bringing news that war had been declared between France and Spain (since December 1718).
- April 25 – Daniel Defoe's Robinson Crusoe is published in London. Initially anonymous, by the end of the year it will have run through four editions and is significant in establishing extended realistic fiction as a literary genre.
- April 26 – King Philip V of Spain departs Madrid and leads 15,000 men of the Spanish Army into Navare to fight the French under Berwick.
- May 14 – In Louisiana (New France), Bienville, from Mobile, captures Pensacola, but Pensacola is later recaptured by the Spanish, and again re-taken by Bienville.
- May 25 – An earthquake in Turkey damages İzmit and Istanbul, damaging some city walls and ruining mosques and palaces.
- June 4 – Battle of Ösel Island: A Russian naval force defeats the Swedish fleet.
- June 10 – Battle of Glen Shiel: British forces defeat the Jacobites and their Spanish allies in Scotland.
- June 18 – Captain John Perry fixes the Dagenham Breach of the River Thames in England.
- June 20 – Battle of Francavilla: The Austrians are defeated by the Spanish.
- June 30 – French forces under the Duke of Berwick, open the Siege of San Sebastian.

=== July–September ===
- July 11 – Russia's Baltic Sea fleet is first spotted from the Swedish coast, starting the Russian Pillage of 1719–21 as part of the Great Northern War.
- July 16 – Attack on Marstrand: the Carlsten fortress in Sweden surrenders to a Danish and Norwegian force after a siege of seven days. Colonel Henrich Danckwardt, who surrendered the fortress to Peter Tordenskjold after being away from it while it was still defensible, is beheaded on September 16.
- August 13 – In the Battle of Stäket, Crown Prince Frederick I of Sweden leads the successful defense of Stockholm from Russian Admiral Fyodor Apraksin's Baltic Fleet during the Russian Pillage.
- August 19 – Siege of San Sebastian: The Spanish garrison surrenders to the Duke of Berwick.
- August 20 – Princess Maria Josepha of Austria, at one time the heir presumptive to the throne of Austria's Habsburg Empire, marries Frederick Augustus, Elector of Saxony ten days after renouncing any claim to the Austrian throne.
- September 3 – The three-story tall Opernhaus am Zwinger, one of the largest opera houses in the world at the time, opens in Dresden by staging Antonio Lotti's Giovi in Argo.
- September 29 – Muhammad Shah is crowned as the 12th Mughal Emperor of India at Shahjahanabad (modern-day Delhi), 12 days after the death of Shah Jahan II from tuberculosis.

=== October–December ===
- October 11 – Fernando Manuel de Bustillo Bustamante y Rueda, the Spanish Governor-General of the Philippines, is assassinated in a bloody coup d'etat by supporters of the Archbishop of Manila, whom Bustamante had imprisoned.
- October 14 – The British Army, under the command of Major General George Wade, invades and captures the forts of Vigo on the Atlantic coast of Spain.
- October 21 – The Red Canal is opened in the Russian capital, Saint Petersburg, after seven years of construction, at a ceremony in the presence of the Tsar Peter the Great.
- October 28 – Sweden and Denmark-Norway sign an armistice, halting combat in the Great Northern War between them, with final terms agreed to in the Treaty of Frederiksborg on July 3, 1720.
- November 9 – Treaties of Stockholm (Great Northern War): In a treaty with Hanover, Sweden cedes the Duchies of Bremen and Verden (in northern Germany) to Hanover.
- December 2 – Workers in Falun Mine, Sweden, find the apparently petrified body of "Fet-Mats" Israelsson (d. 1677), in a flooded part of the copper workings.
- December 21 – James Moore Jr. leads a coup in the Province of South Carolina which overthrows proprietary government.
- December 22 – Andrew Bradford publishes the American Weekly Mercury, Pennsylvania's first newspaper.

=== Undated ===
- Europe's first systematic population census is taken in the Kingdom of Prussia's Margraviate of Brandenburg.
- In London:
  - Raine's Foundation School, Bethnal Green (founded by Henry Raine), opens in Wapping (closed 2020).
  - James Figg opens one of the first indoor venues for combat sports, adjoining the City of Oxford tavern in Oxford Road.

== Births ==
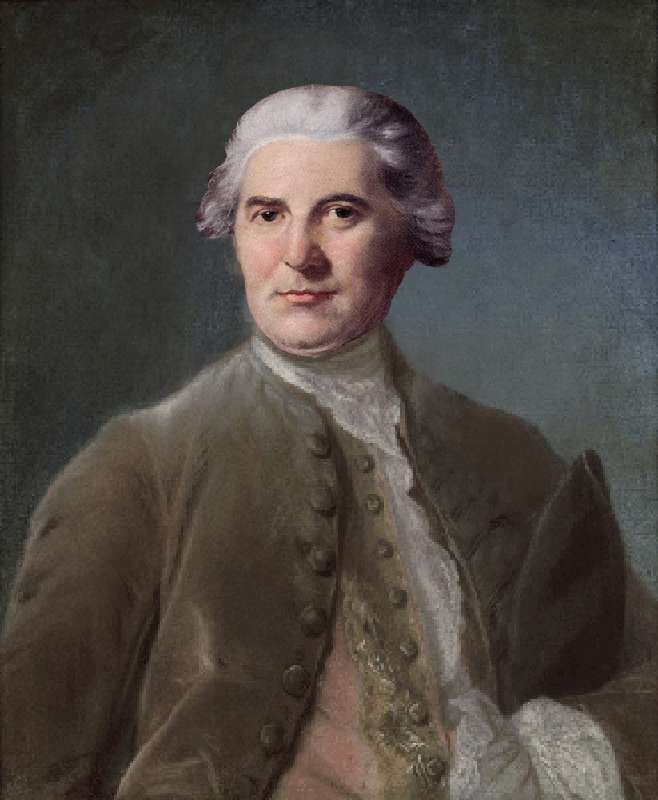
Jacques-Alexandre Laffon de Ladebat born 2 January

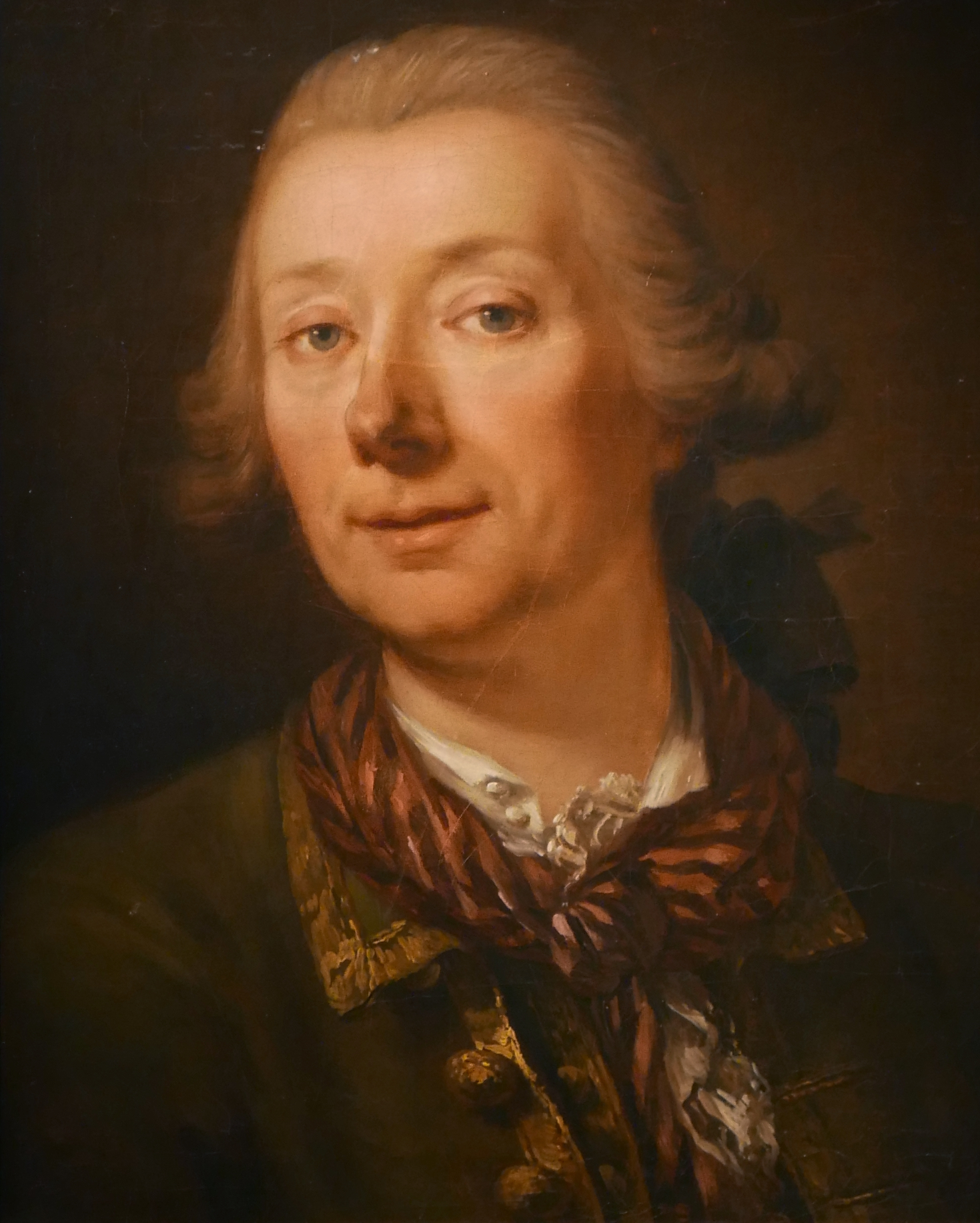
Guillaume de Barrême de Châteaufort born 6 January

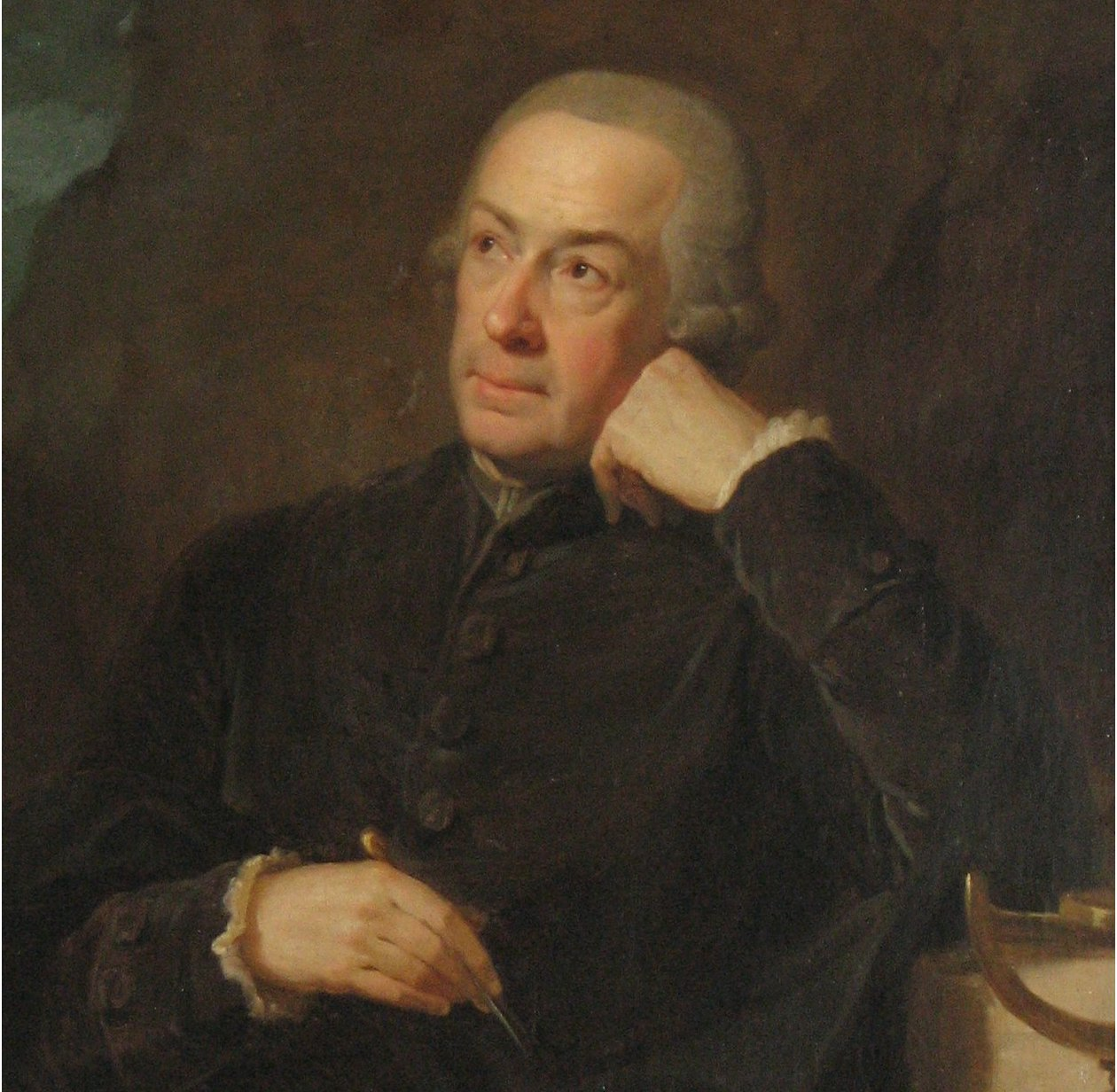
Joseph Liesganig born 13 February

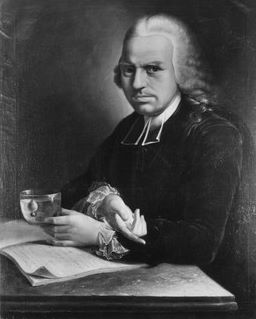
Ferdinand Christoph Oetinger born 18 February

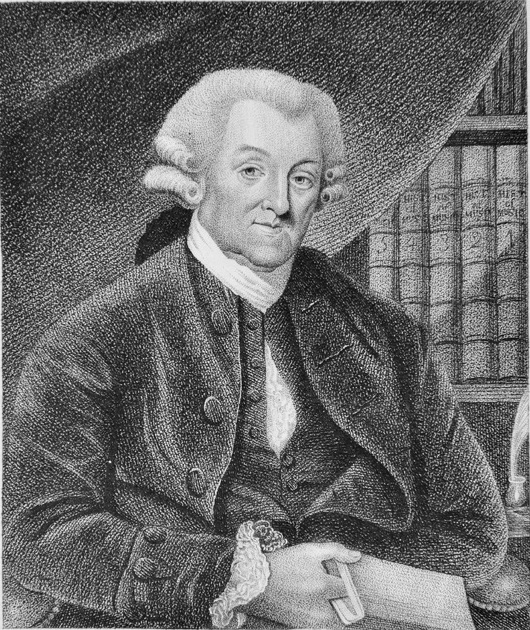
John Hawkins born 29 March

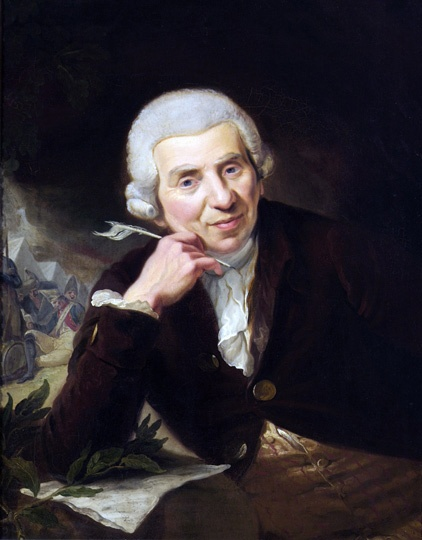
Johann Wilhelm Ludwig Gleim born 2 April

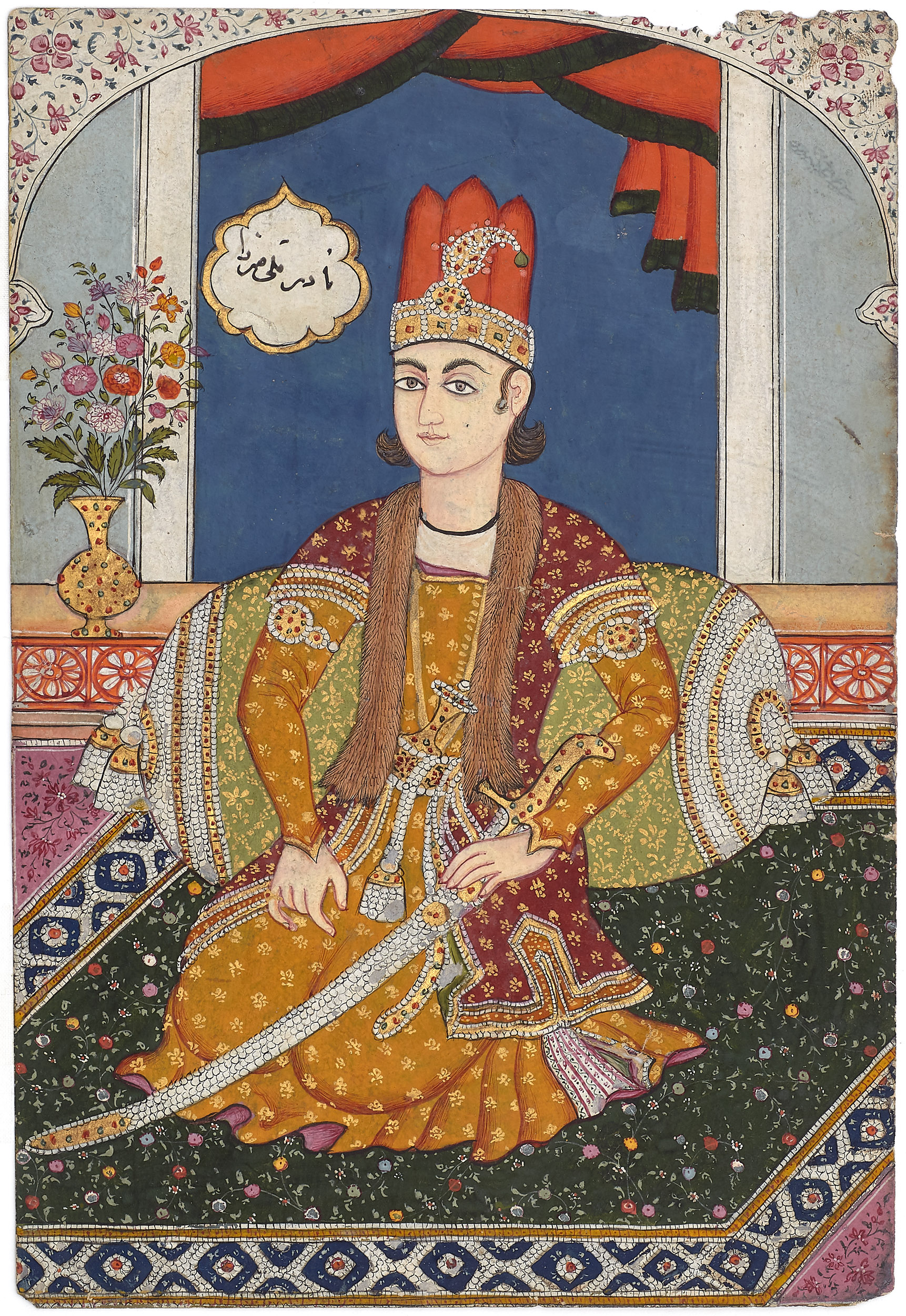
Reza Qoli Mirza Afshar born 5 April

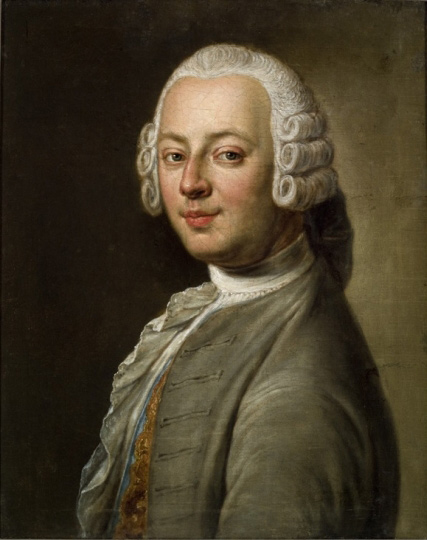
Christian Gottfried Krause born 17 April

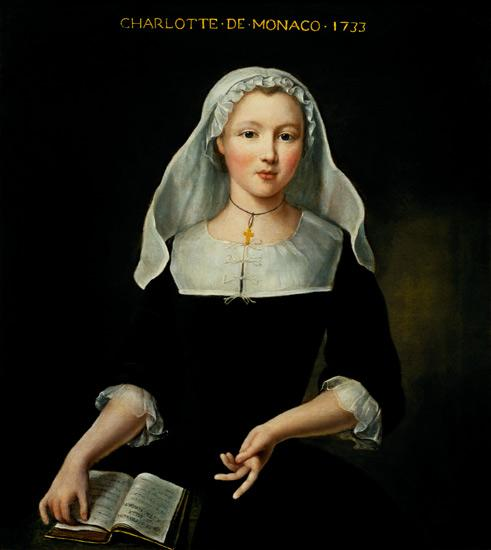
Charlotte of Monaco born 19 May

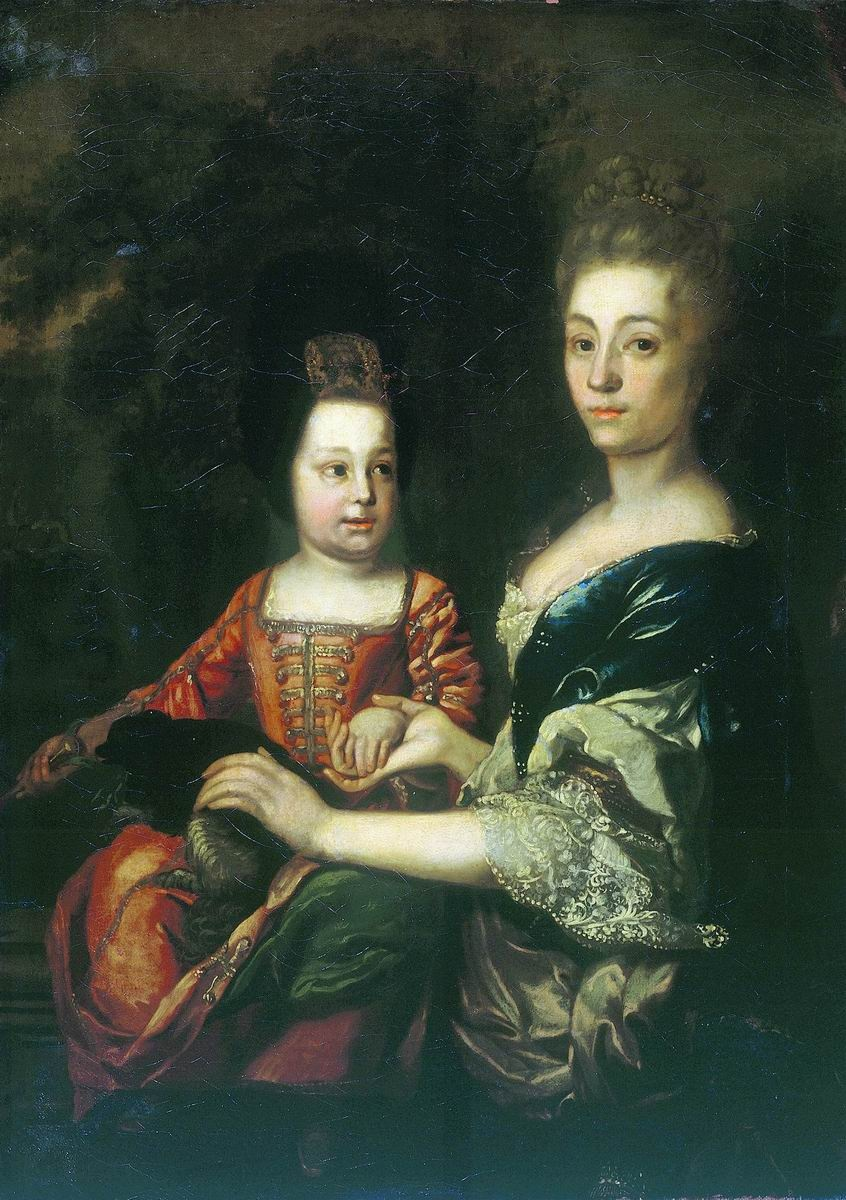
Julia von Mengden born 22 May

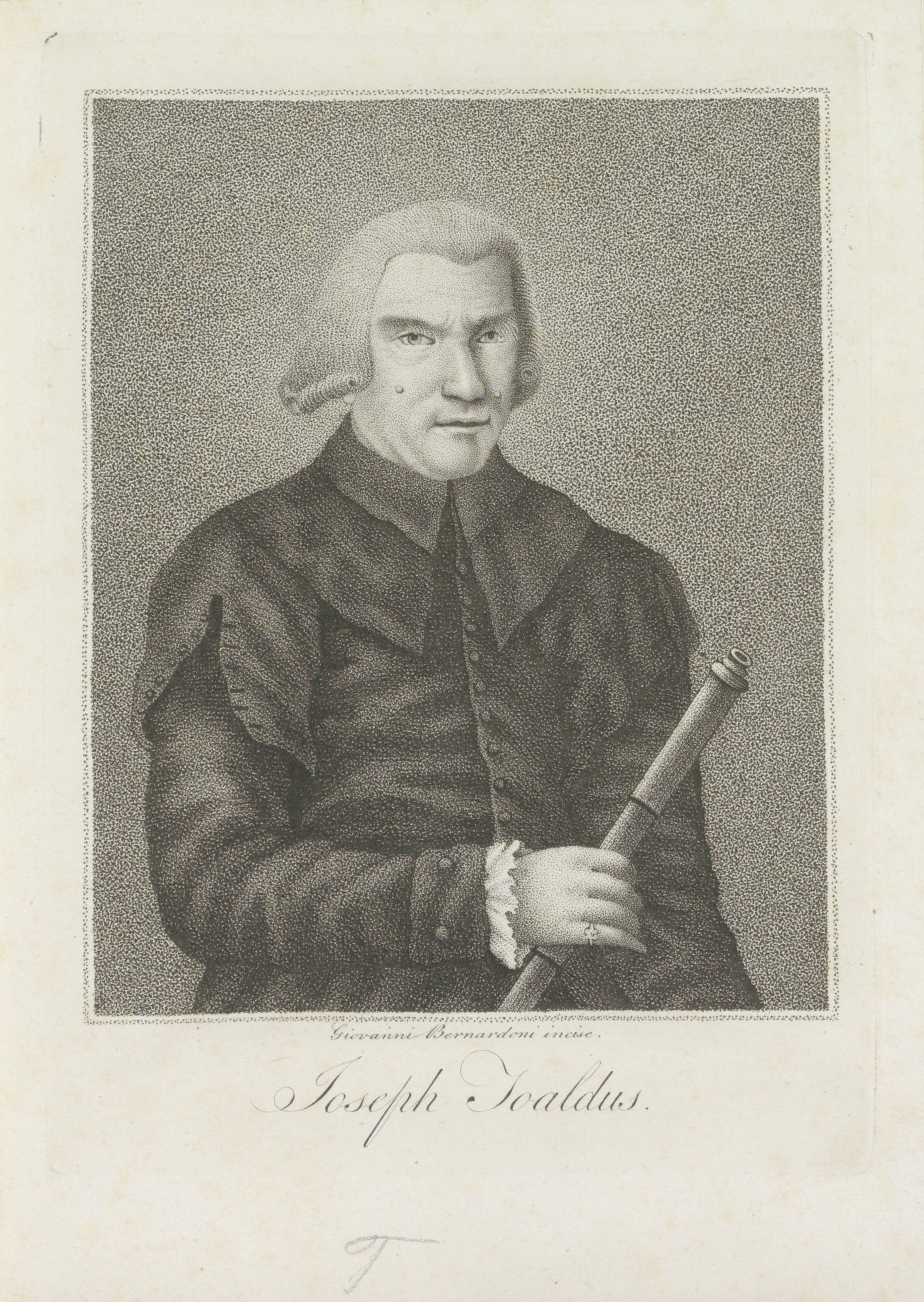
Giuseppe Toaldo born 11 July

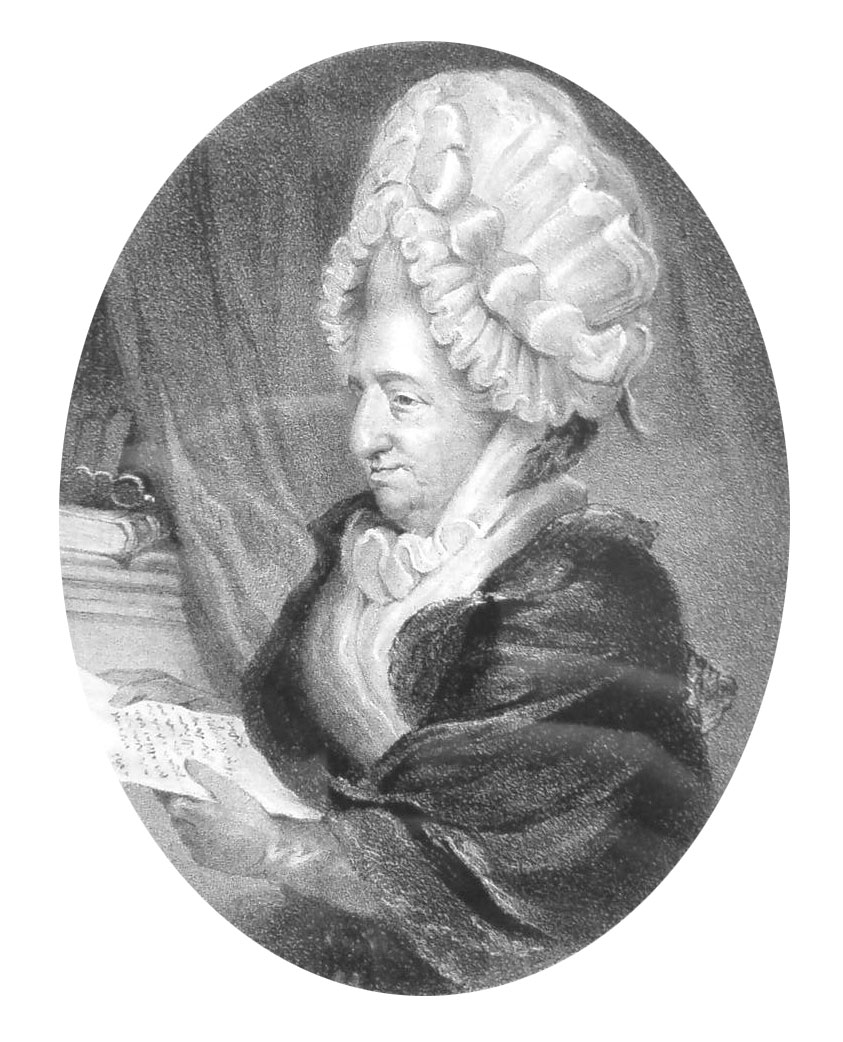
Frances Boscawen born 23 July

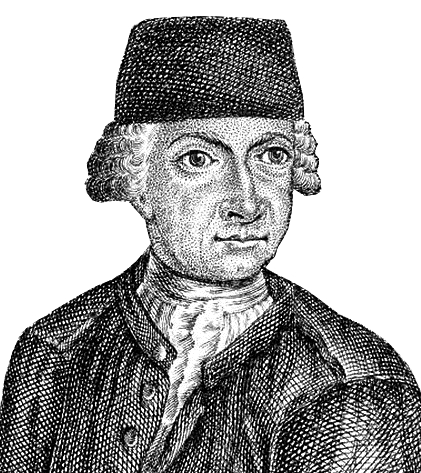
Johann Gottlob Lehmann born 4 August

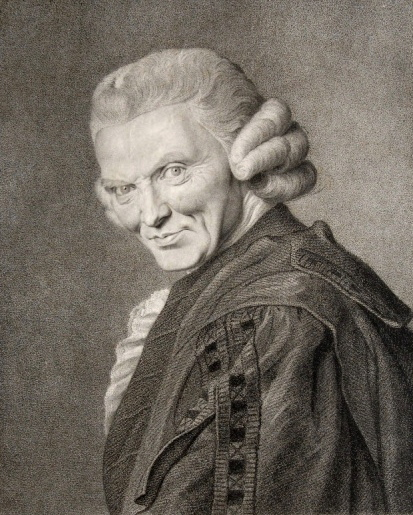
Robert Glynn born 5 August

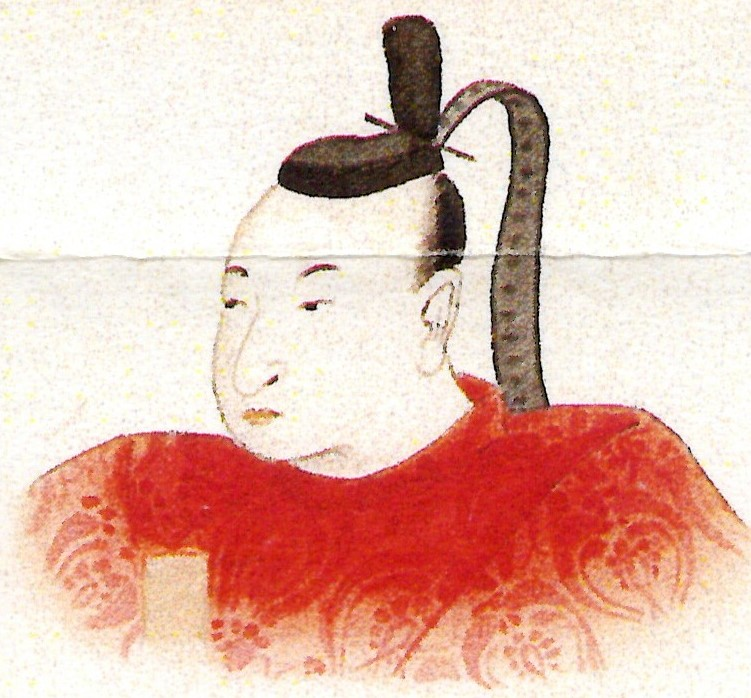
Itakura Katsuzumi born 13 August

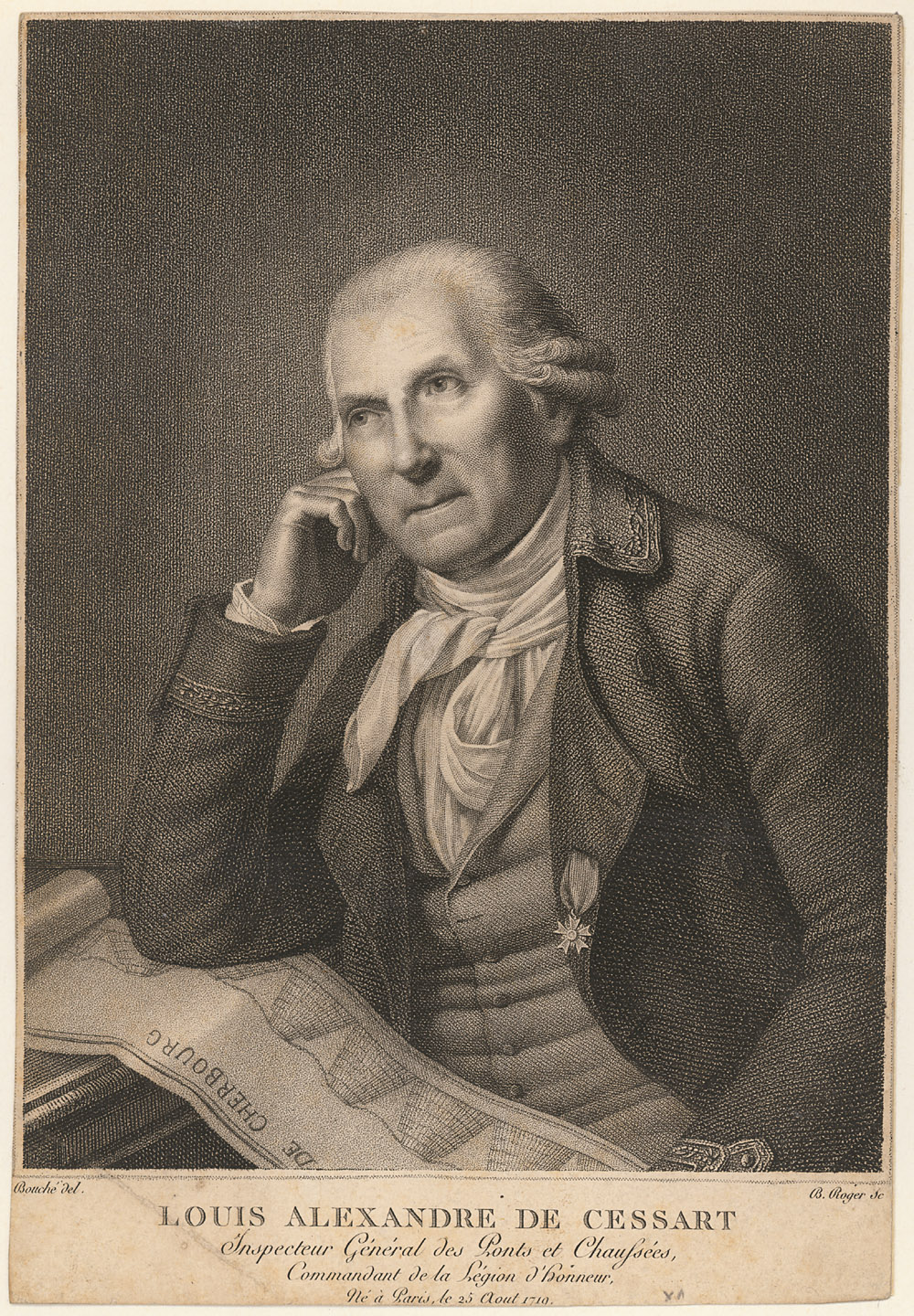
Louis-Alexandre de Cessart born 25 August

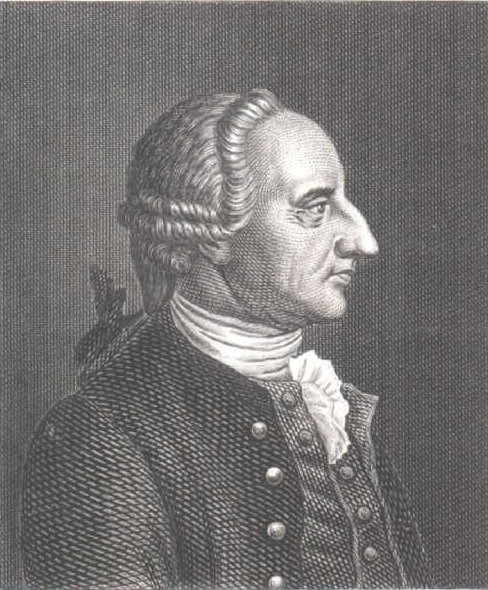
Abraham Gotthelf Kästner born 27 September

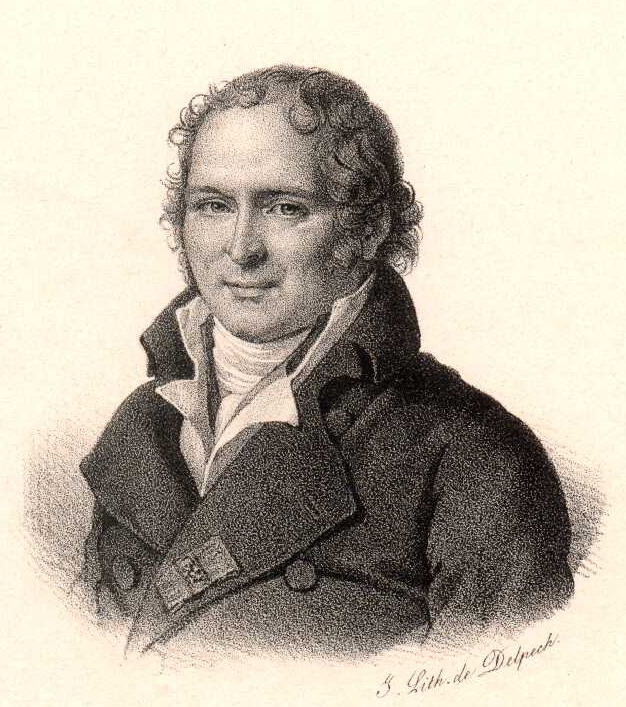
François Poulletier de la Salle born 30 September

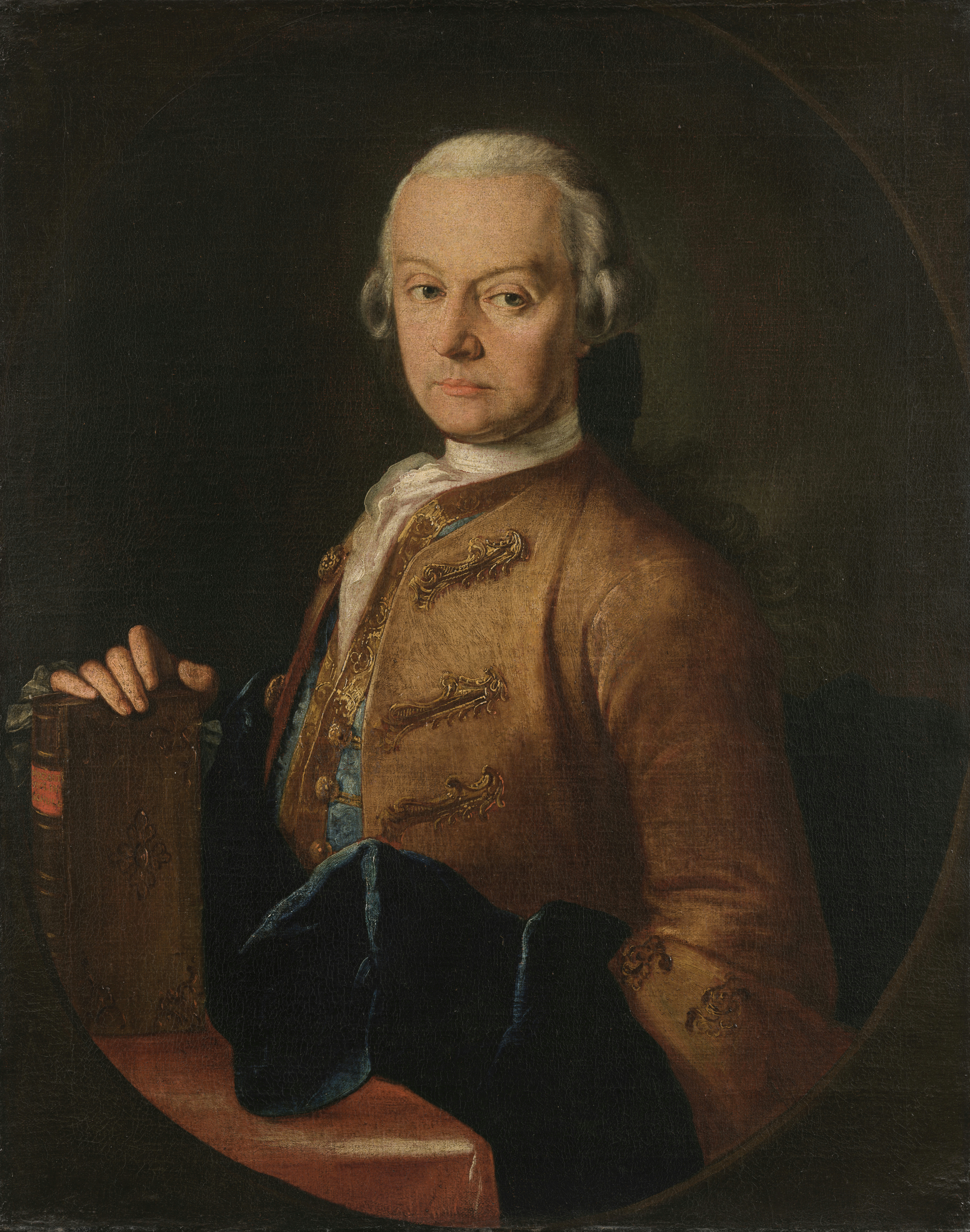
Leopold Mozart born 14 November

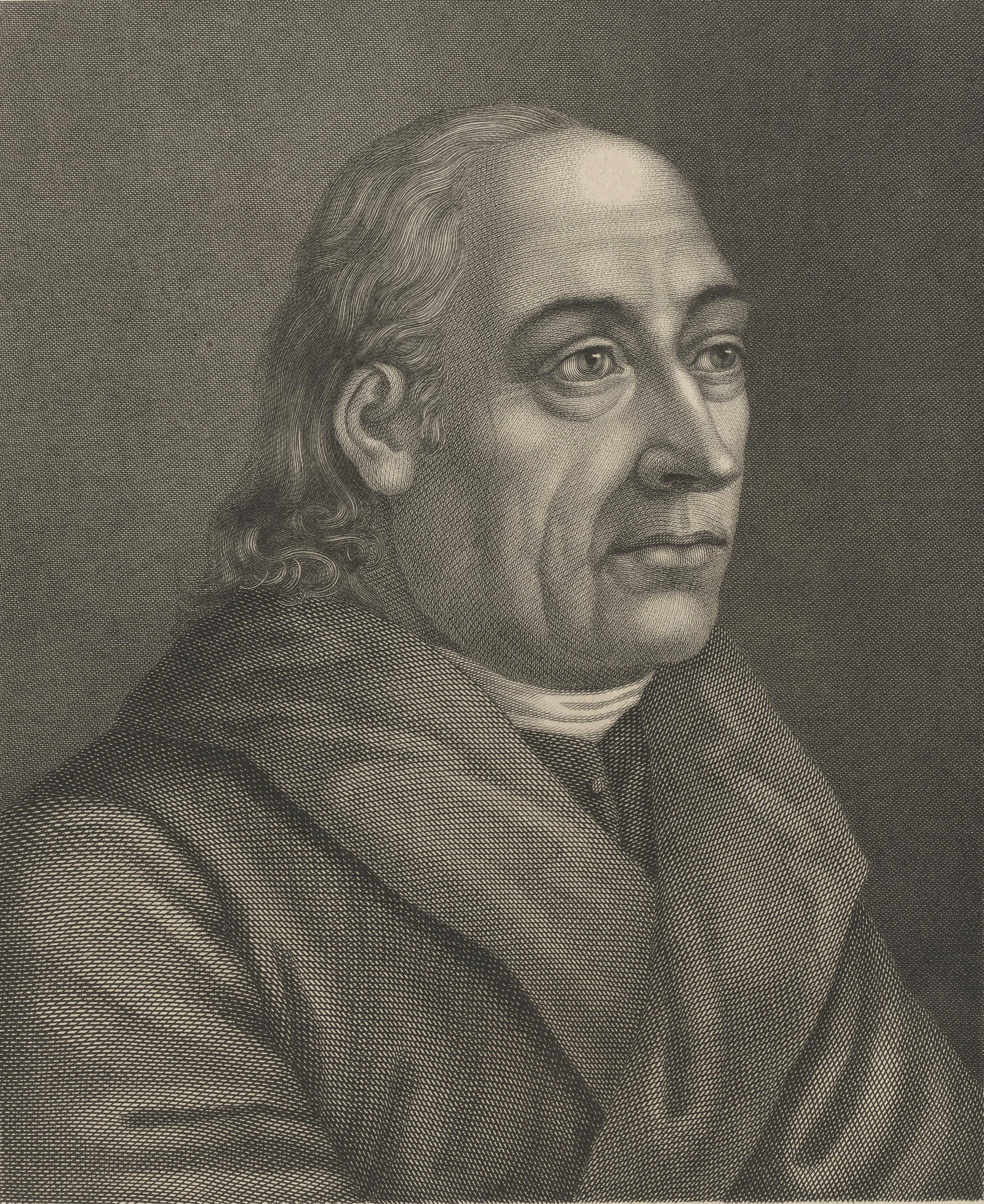
Johann Gottlob Immanuel Breitkopf born 23 November

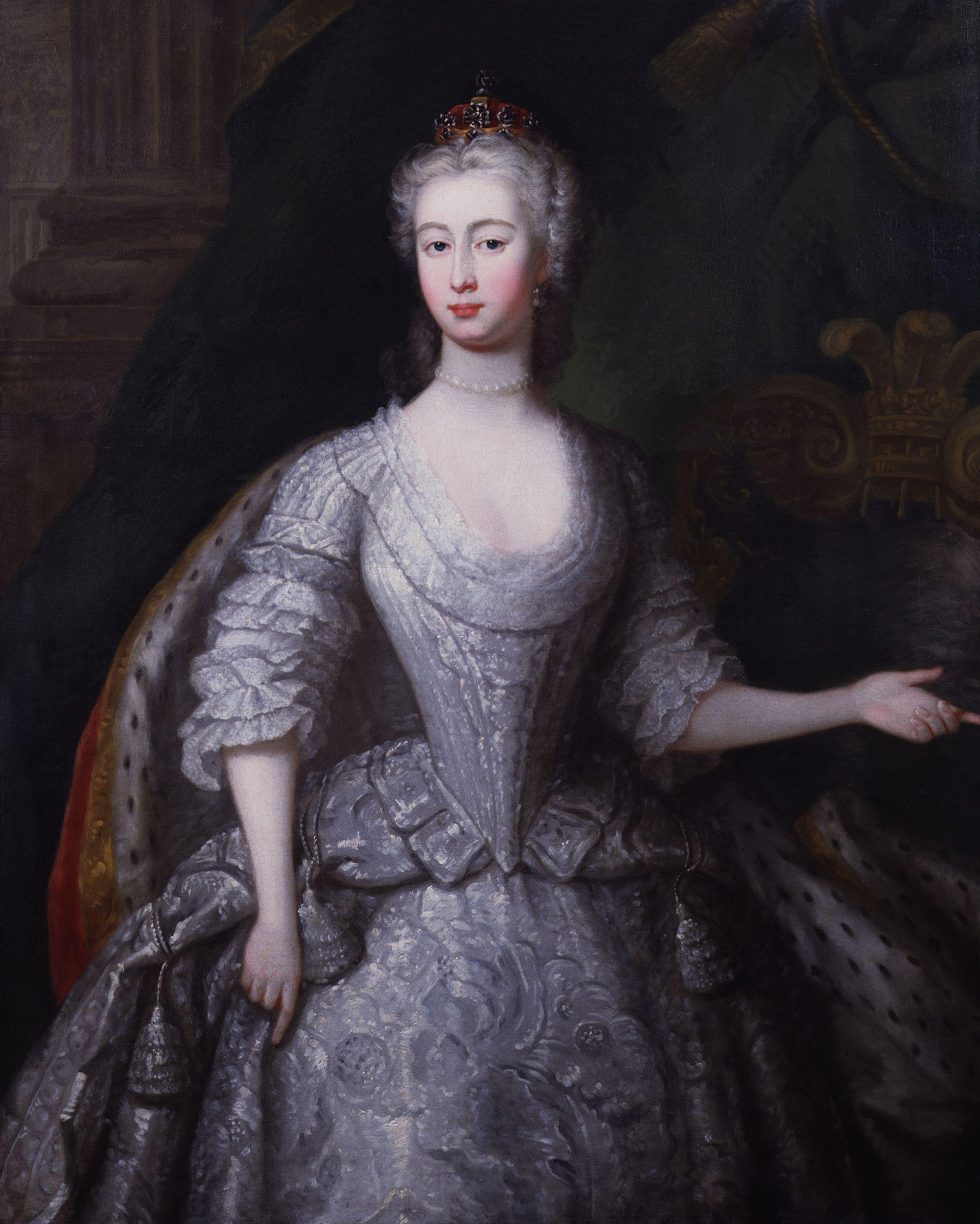
Princess Augusta of Saxe-Gotha born 30 November

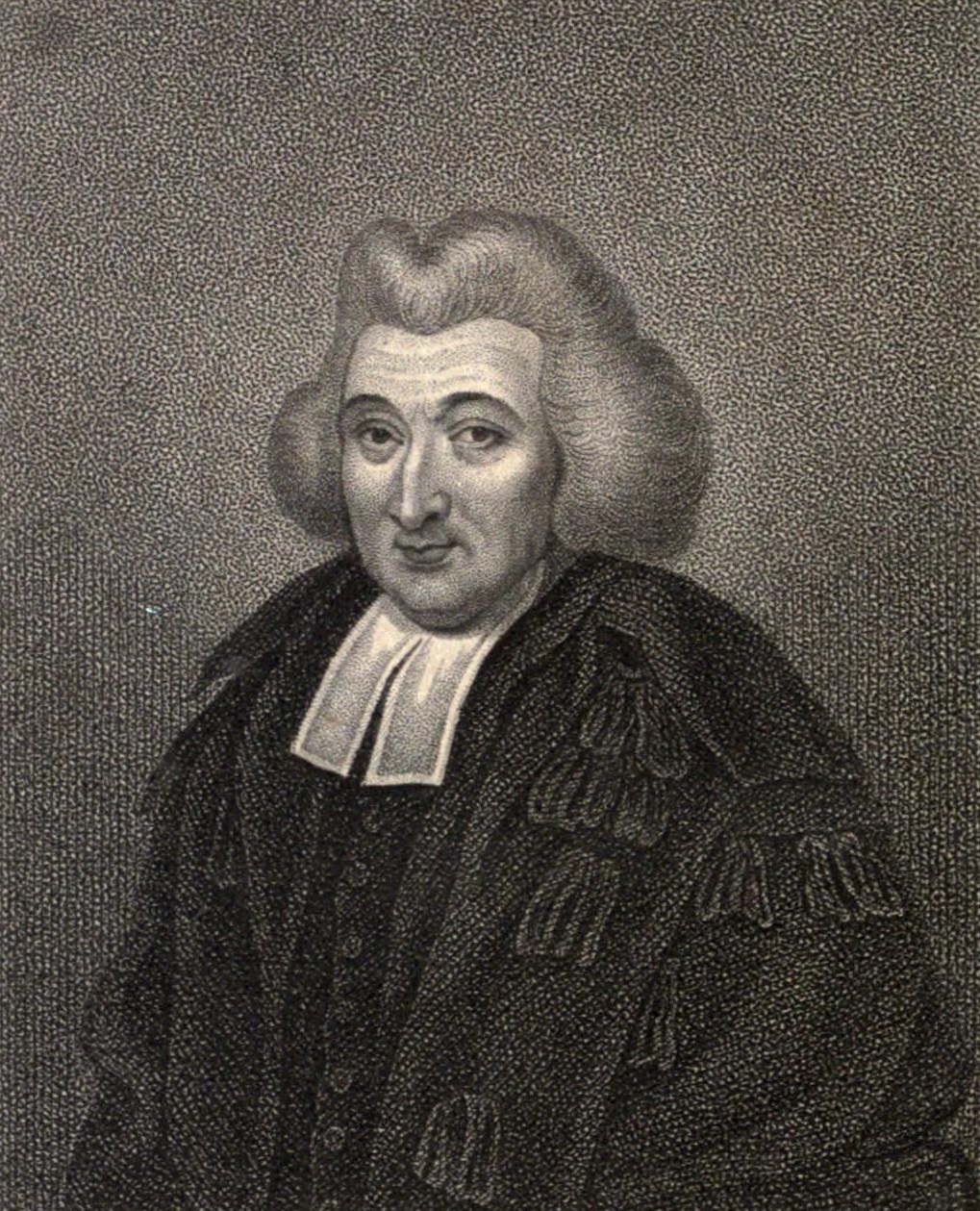
George Campbell born 25 December

=== January ===
- January 1 – Pierre-François Hugues d'Hancarville, art historian and historian of ideas (d. 1805)
- January 2
  - Jacques-Alexandre Laffon de Ladebat, French shipbuilder and merchant (d. 1797)
  - Friedrich Christoph von Saldern, German general (d. 1785)
- January 3
  - Friedrich Karl Joseph von Erthal, Catholic archbishop (d. 1802)
  - Basil Feilding, 6th Earl of Denbigh, Earl in the Peerage of England (d. 1800)
  - Francisco José Freire, Portuguese historian and philologist (d. 1773)
- January 6
  - Ivan Ivanovich Belsky, Russian painter (d. 1799)
  - Guillaume de Barrême de Châteaufort, French painter (d. 1775)
  - William Hammond, British hymnist (d. 1783)
  - Ignazio Marabitti, Italian artist (d. 1797)
- January 10 – Maria Dorothea Wagner, German painter (d. 1792)
- January 14 – Daniel Nettelbladt, German jurist and philosopher (d. 1791)
- January 15 – William Fitzwilliam, 3rd Earl Fitzwilliam, British peer (d. 1756)
- January 17
  - Maria van Antwerpen, soldier (d. 1781)
  - Samuel Enderby, English whale oil merchant who sponsored Arctic exploration (d. 1797)
  - Rajmundo Kunić, Croatian writer (d. 1794)
  - Johann Elias Schlegel, German critic and poet (d. 1749)
  - William Vernon, American merchant (d. 1806)
- January 22
  - Benjamin Hinman, surveyor, soldier, legislator (d. 1810)
  - Henry Paget, 2nd Earl of Uxbridge, British Earl (d. 1769)
- January 23 – John Landen, English mathematician (d. 1790)
- January 25 – Princess Sophia Dorothea of Prussia (d. 1765)
- January 30 – Magnus Gottfried Lichtwer, German writer (d. 1783)

=== February ===
- February 2 – Edward Coke, Viscount Coke, British politician (d. 1753)
- February 4 – Ernst Wilhelm von Schlabrendorf, German politician (d. 1769)
- February 6 – Alberto Pullicino, Maltese painter (d. 1765)
- February 10 – Clemente Sibiliato, Italian cleric (d. 1795)
- February 11 – Vasilije Božičković, Eparch of Križevci (d. 1785)
- February 13
  - Samuel Finney, English miniature-painter (d. 1798)
  - Joseph Liesganig, Austrian astronomer and Jesuit (d. 1799)
- February 14 – David Doig, writer (d. 1800)
- February 15
  - Wilhelm Sebastian von Belling, German general (d. 1779)
  - Jean Jacques Flipart, Engraver from France (d. 1782)
  - Crown Prince Hyojang, crown prince of Joseon, son of king Yeongjo of Joseon (d. 1728)
- February 18 – Ferdinand Christoph Oetinger, German physician (d. 1772)
- February 19 – Arthur Blennerhassett, Anglo-Irish politician (d. 1799)
- February 20
  - Joseph Bellamy, American pastor, author and educator (d. 1790)
  - Charles Clarke, English numismatist (d. 1780)
- February 22 – Joshua Thomas, Historian of Welsh Baptists (d. 1797)
- February 23 – Moses Mather, American clergyman (d. 1806)
- February 27 – Alejandro González Velázquez, Spanish architect and painter (d. 1772)

=== March ===
- March 1 – Daniel Thurston, American army officer (d. 1805)
- March 4 – George Pigot, 1st Baron Pigot, British governor of Madras (d. 1777)
- March 6
  - João Carlos de Bragança, 2nd Duke of Lafões, Portuguese politician (d. 1806)
- March 10 – Pierre-Paul Lemercier de La Rivière de Saint-Médard, French economist (d. 1801)
- March 13 – John Griffin, 4th Baron Howard de Walden, British nobleman and soldier (d. 1797)
- March 16 – Prince Georg Ludwig of Holstein-Gottorp, Prussian lieutenant-general, Imperial Russian field marshal (d. 1763)
- March 17 – Gabriel Podoski, Catholic archbishop (d. 1777)
- March 23 – Anna Catharina Bischoff, Lady (or mummy) of the Barfüsser Church (d. 1787)
- March 26 – Lubbert Jan van Eck, Dutch noble (d. 1765)
- March 29 – John Hawkins, English author and music historian (d. 1789)
- March 30 – John Wentworth, American jurist, soldier, leader of the American Revolution in New Hampshire (d. 1781)

=== April ===
- April 2
  - Vincenzo Legrenzo Ciampi, Italian composer (d. 1762)
  - Johann Wilhelm Ludwig Gleim, German poet (d. 1803)
- April 3
  - Daniel Dupuy, American silversmith (d. 1807)
  - Thomas Grenville, Royal Navy officer killed in action in the War of the Austrian Succession (d. 1747)
- April 4 – Mary Draper, American revolutionary character (d. 1810)
- April 5
  - Reza Qoli Mirza Afshar, prince of Persia (d. 1747)
  - Axel von Fersen the Elder, lantmarskalk or marshal of the diet (d. 1794)
- April 8 – Edmund Pery, 1st Viscount Pery, Irish politician, Speaker of the Irish House of Commons (d. 1806)
- April 9 – Sir Edward Blackett, 4th Baronet, British politician and barrister (d. 1804)
- April 11 – Jakob Friedrich Heusinger, German classical philologist (d. 1778)
- April 13 – John Breynton, Welsh missionary and minister (d. 1799)
- April 16
  - Mathieu-Antoine Bouchaud, French economist and professor (d. 1804)
  - Tsugaru Nobuaki, Japanese Daimyo (d. 1744)
- April 17
  - Friedrich Hensing, German physician (d. 1745)
  - Pierre-Thomas-Nicolas Hurtaut, French writer (d. 1791)
  - Christian Gottfried Krause, German composer (d. 1770)
- April 19 – William Banks, British politician (d. 1761)
- April 22 – Jacques Rochette de La Morlière, French writer (d. 1785)
- April 24 – Giuseppe Marc'Antonio Baretti, Italian-born English literary critic and author (d. 1789)
- April 28 – Sir Edward Turner, 2nd Baronet, British politician (d. 1766)

=== May ===
- May 5 – Andrew Meikle, Scottish engineer (d. 1811)
- May 6 – Jean Baptiste Christy de La Pallière, French Navy officer (d. 1787)
- May 8 – Nicholas Dias Abeysinghe, ceylonese Dutch colonial administrator (d. 1794)
- May 17 – Bjarni Pálsson, Icelandic doctor (d. 1779)
- May 19
  - Johann von Fries, counsellor, director of the imperial silk factories, industrialist, banker (d. 1785)
  - Charlotte of Monaco, Monegasque princess and nun (d. 1790)
  - Matthew Patten, American judge (d. 1795)
- May 20 – Roger Newdigate, English politician, antiquities collector (d. 1806)
- May 22
  - Charles Howard, Viscount Morpeth, British politician (d. 1741)
  - Julia von Mengden, Russian noble (d. 1787)
  - Matsudaira Nobunao, daimyo of the middle Edo period; 2nd lord of Hamamatsu, later 1st lord of Yoshida (d. 1768)
- May 24 – Eyre Massey, 1st Baron Clarina, Irish Baron (d. 1804)
- May 27 – Henri-Joseph Dulaurens, French writer (d. 1793)
- May 29 – Lorenzo De Caro, Italian painter (d. 1777)
- May 31 – Robert Rutherfurd, Scottish merchant, Baron of the Russian Empire (d. 1794)

=== June ===
- June 2 – Michel-Jean Sedaine, French dramatist and librettist (d. 1797)
- June 3 – Louis Paul Abeille, economist (d. 1807)
- June 5 – Domenico Orsini d'Aragona, Italian cardinal (d. 1789)
- June 10
  - Michael Gottlieb Agnethler, German botanist and numismatist (d. 1752)
  - Francisco Mariano Nipho, Spanish writer (d. 1803)
- June 11 – François-Charles de Velbrück, Roman Catholic bishop (d. 1784)
- June 17 – Joshua Parry, Welsh nonconformist minister and writer (d. 1776)
- June 19 – Sir Thomas Clavering, 7th Baronet, British politician (d. 1794)
- June 28 – Étienne François, duc de Choiseul, French general, diplomat, statesman (d. 1785)

=== July ===
- July 2 – Josip Šišković, Hapsburg military officer (d. 1783)
- July 7
  - William de Grey, 1st Baron Walsingham, British lawyer, judge, politician (d. 1781)
  - Johann Karl von Herberstein, Austrian bishop (d. 1787)
- July 11 – Giuseppe Toaldo, Italian physicist (d. 1797)
- July 16
  - William Walond Sr., English composer and organist (d. 1768)
  - Gerrit Zegelaar, Dutch painter (d. 1794)
- July 23 – Frances Boscawen, English literary hostess; (d. 1805)
- July 25 – Chevalier de Johnstone, Jacobite Army officer (d. 1800)
- July 26 – Elizabeth Pakenham, 1st Countess of Longford, English noblewoman (d. 1794)
- July 29 – William Innes, British Member of Parliament (d. 1795)

=== August ===
- August 4 – Johann Gottlob Lehmann, German and Russian mineralogist (d. 1767)
- August 5 – Robert Glynn, British doctor (d. 1800)
- August 7
  - Francisco Fabián y Fuero, Roman Catholic archbishop (d. 1801)
  - Jabez Huntington, American businessman 1719–1786 (d. 1786)
- August 10 – Philip Thicknesse, author (d. 1792)
- August 11 – George Selwyn, British politician (d. 1791)
- August 13 – Itakura Katsuzumi, Japanese samurai (d. 1769)
- August 18 – Bernard Ward, 1st Viscount Bangor, Irish politician and peer (d. 1781)
- August 19 – Charles-François de Broglie, marquis de Ruffec, French soldier, diplomat (d. 1781)
- August 20
  - James Bonner, American colonel (d. 1782)
  - Christian Mayer, Czech-German astronomer (d. 1783)
- August 23 – Pierre Poivre, French horticulturalist (d. 1786)
- August 25
  - Louis-Alexandre de Cessart, French engineer (d. 1806)
  - Charles-Amédée-Philippe van Loo, French painter (d. 1795)
- August 26 – Carlo Sebastiano Berardi, Italian jurist (d. 1768)

=== September ===
- September 3 – Ferdinand Zellbell the Younger, Swedish composer (d. 1780)
- September 6 – Somerset Hamilton Butler, 1st Earl of Carrick (d. 1754)
- September 11 – Tanuma Okitsugu, Japanese government official (d. 1788)
- September 13 – Étienne Ficquet, engraver (d. 1794)
- September 15 – Friedrich Christian Meuschen, German zoologist (d. 1811)
- September 17
  - Edward Kimber, British writer (d. 1769)
  - James Smith, signatory to the United States Declaration of Independence (d. 1806)
- September 21
  - Larcum Kendall, British watchmaker (d. 1790)
  - Johann Friedrich Mayer, agriculturalist (d. 1798)
- September 24 – Florian Baucke, Jesuit missionary (d. 1780)
- September 27 – Abraham Gotthelf Kästner, German mathematician (d. 1800)
- September 30 – François Poulletier de la Salle, chemist and medical doctor (d. 1788)

=== October ===
- October 1 – John Bligh, 3rd Earl of Darnley, British politician (d. 1781)
- October 3 – Paul Henry Ourry, British Member of Parliament (d. 1783)
- October 7 – Jacques Cazotte, French writer (d. 1792)
- October 9 – Georg Mathias Fuchs, German painter in Denmark (d. 1797)
- October 10 – Francis Greville, 1st Earl of Warwick, English Earl (d. 1773)
- October 12 – Ignaz Franz, German priest, hymnwriter (d. 1790)
- October 13 – Josef Ignaz Mildorfer, Austrian painter (d. 1775)
- October 14 – John Holker, English Jacobite soldier, industrialist and commercial spy (d. 1786)
- October 18 – Charles Bulkley, British minister (d. 1797)
- October 20 – Gottfried Achenwall, German philosopher, historian, economist, jurist, statistician (d. 1772)
- October 23 – Peter Fenger, Danish merchant (d. 1774)
- October 24
  - Jakob Gadolin, Finnish bishop (d. 1802)
  - Pierre Sigorgne, French physicist (d. 1809)
- October 25 – Edward Townshend, Anglican dean of Norwich (d. 1765)
- October 26
  - Sir William Codrington, 2nd Baronet, British Member of Parliament (d. 1792)
  - Hyacinthe Gaëtan de Lannion, French politician (d. 1762)
- October 30 – Lazzaro Opizio Pallavicino, Italian priest (d. 1785)

=== November ===
- November 6 – Louis-Antoine Caraccioli, French writer, poet and historian (d. 1803)
- November 9 – Domenico Lorenzo Ponziani, Italian chess player (d. 1796)
- November 14
  - Leopold Mozart, German/Austrian composer, father of Wolfgang Amadeus Mozart (d. 1787)
  - Franz Ludwig Wind, Swiss sculptor (d. 1789)
- November 17
  - Marie Marguerite Bihéron, Medical illustrator (d. 1795)
  - Francis Home, Scottish physician (d. 1813)
- November 22 – Johann Friedrich Reiffenstein, German artist (d. 1793)
- November 23
  - Spranger Barry, British actor (d. 1777)
  - Johann Gottlob Immanuel Breitkopf, German publisher and typographer (d. 1794)
  - Philip Wenman, 6th Viscount Wenman, Irish Viscount (d. 1760)
- November 30 – Princess Augusta of Saxe-Gotha, Princess of Wales (d. 1772)

=== December ===
- December 8 – Andrés Marcos Burriel, historian (d. 1762)
- December 13 – Thomas Gillespie, North Carolina planter (d. 1797)
- December 15 – Louis IX, Landgrave of Hesse-Darmstadt (d. 1790)
- December 18 – William Stanhope, 2nd Earl of Harrington, British Army general (d. 1779)
- December 25 – George Campbell, figure of the Scottish Enlightenment (d. 1796)
- December 26 – Salvatore Maria di Blasi, Italian priest (d. 1814)
- December 27 – John Phillips, American academic (d. 1795)
- December 28 – Charles Gravier, comte de Vergennes, French diplomat (d. 1787)
- date unknown
  - William Bradford, American revolutionary and printer (d. 1791)
  - Dominic Serres, French-born painter (d. 1793)
  - Thomas Sheridan, Irish actor (d. 1788)
  - Thomas Elfe, furniture craftsman in Charleston, South Carolina (d. 1775)

== Deaths ==
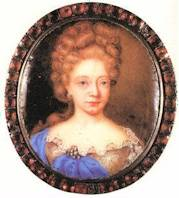
Sophie Amalie Moth died 17 January

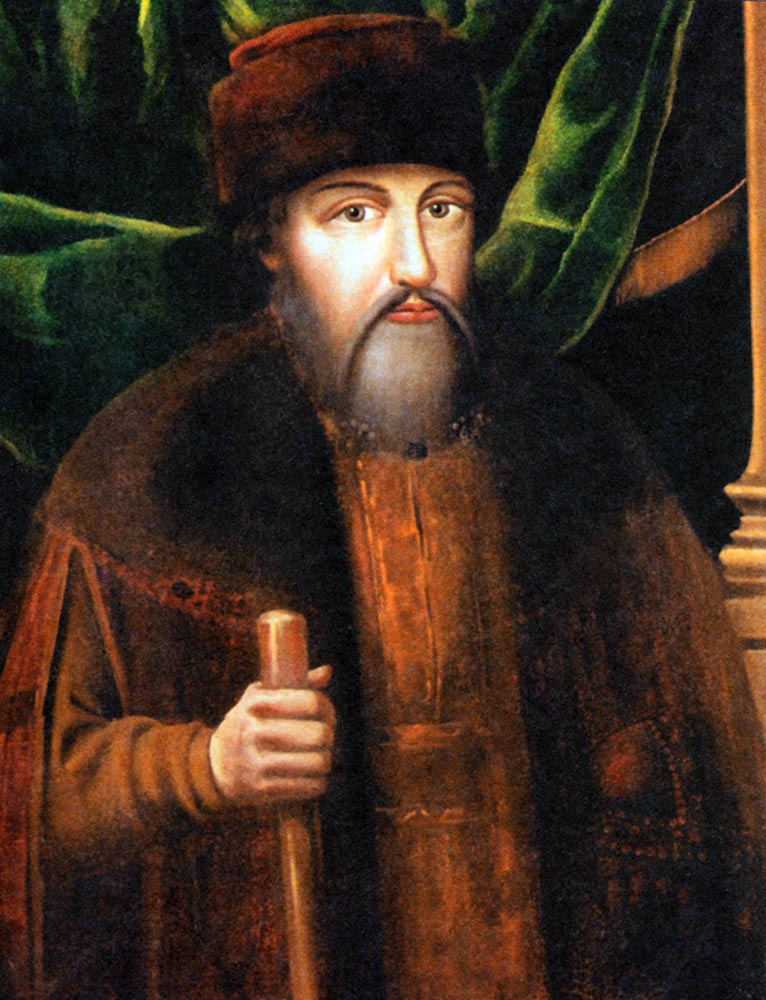
Tikhon Streshnev died 26 January

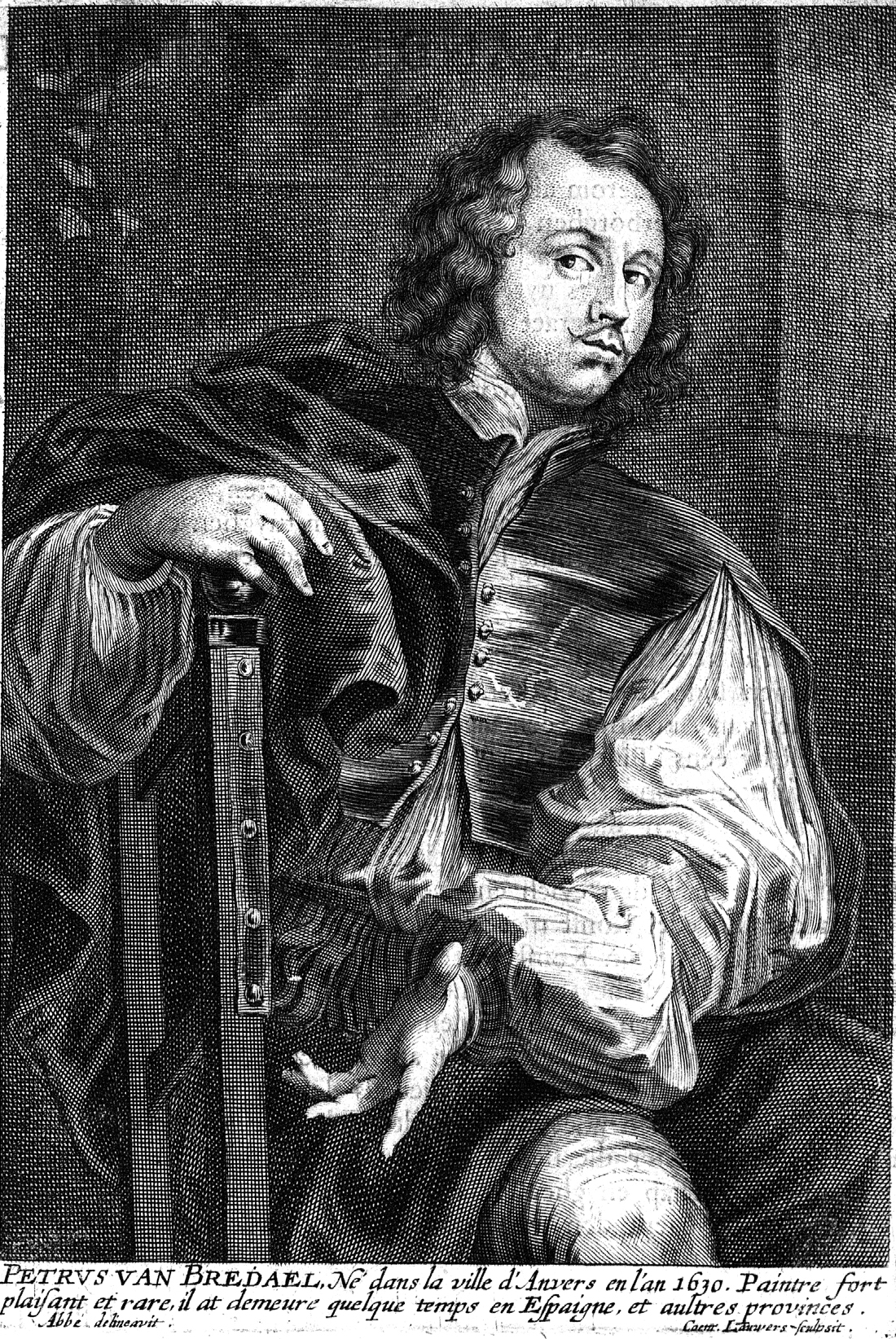
Peeter van Bredael died 9 March

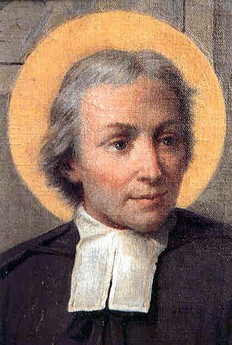
Jean-Baptiste de La Salle died 7 April

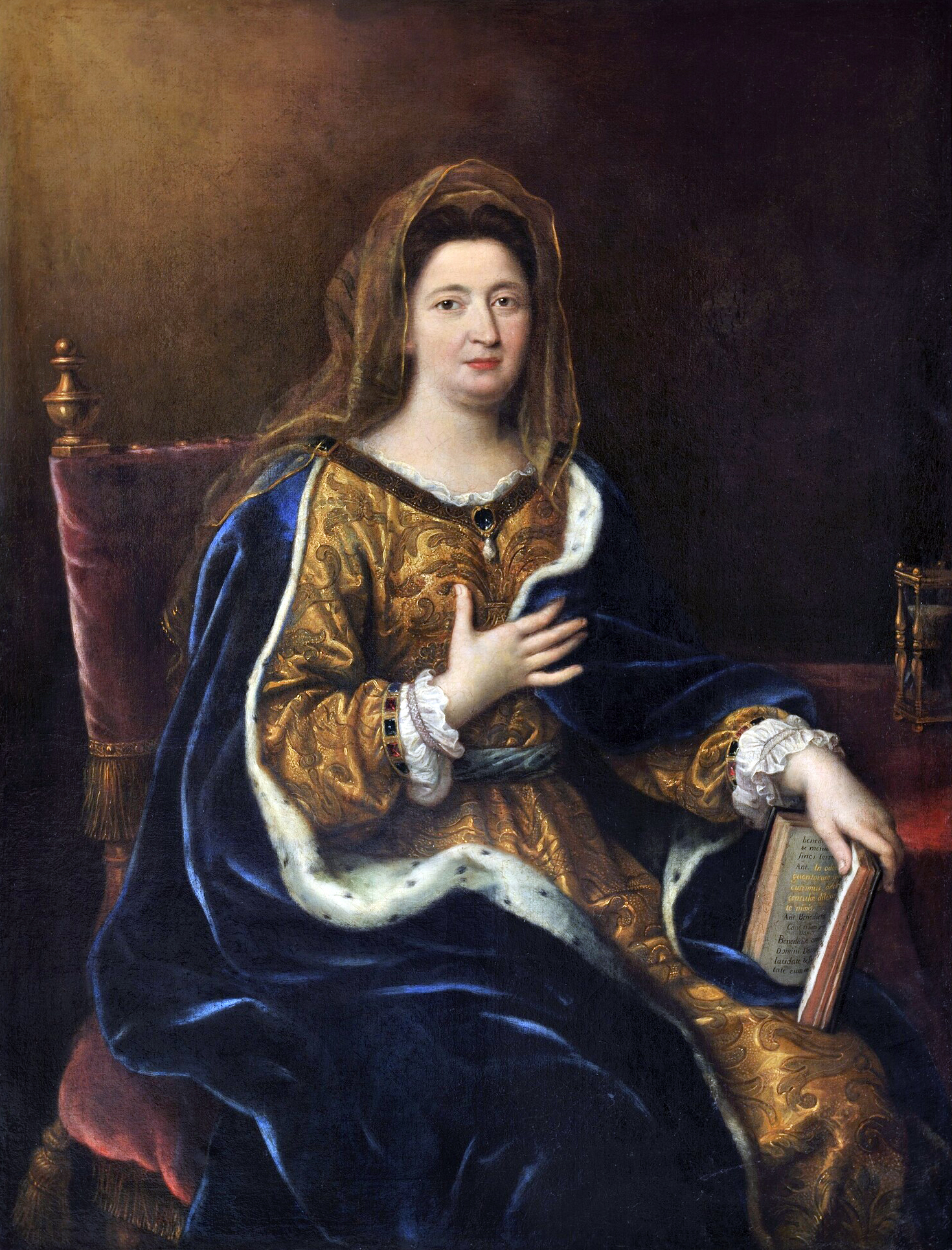
Madame de Maintenon died 15 April

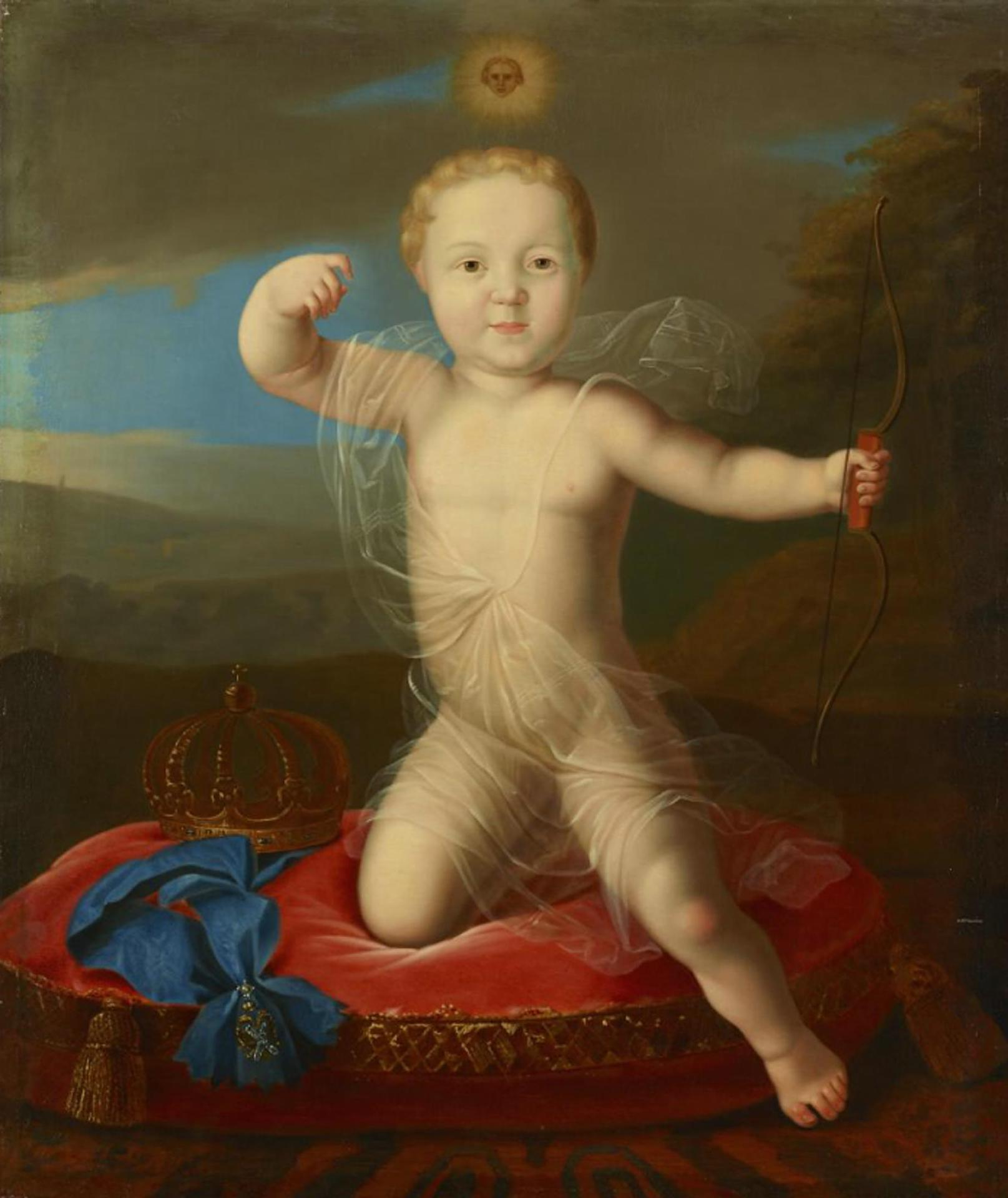
Peter Petrovich died 19 April

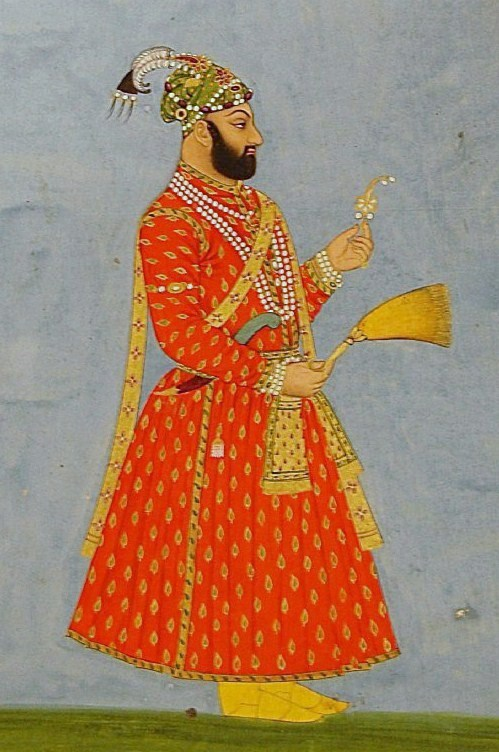
Farrukhsiyar died 28 April

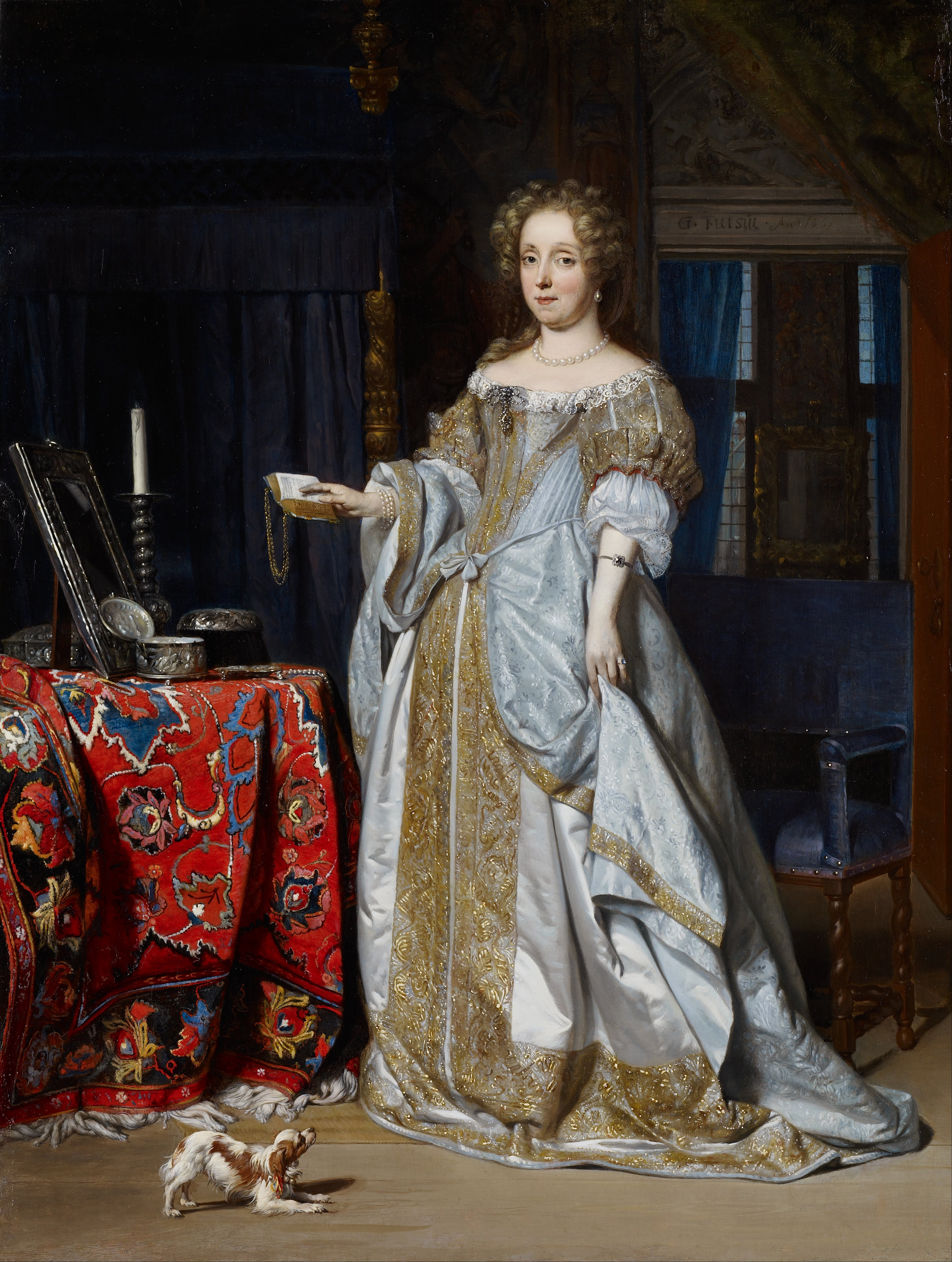
Lucia Wijbrants died 23 May

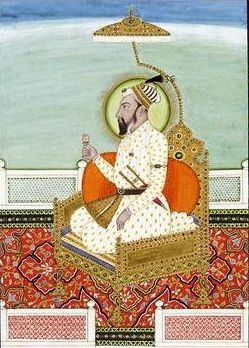
Rafi ud-Darajat died 6 June

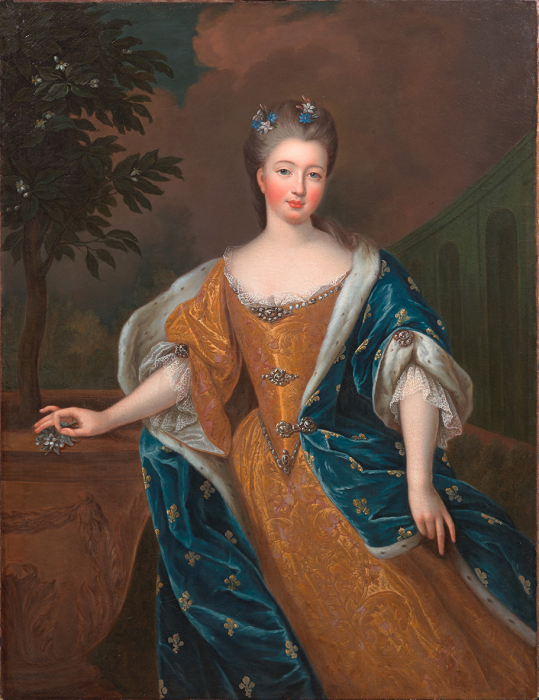
Marie Louise Élisabeth d'Orléans died 21 July

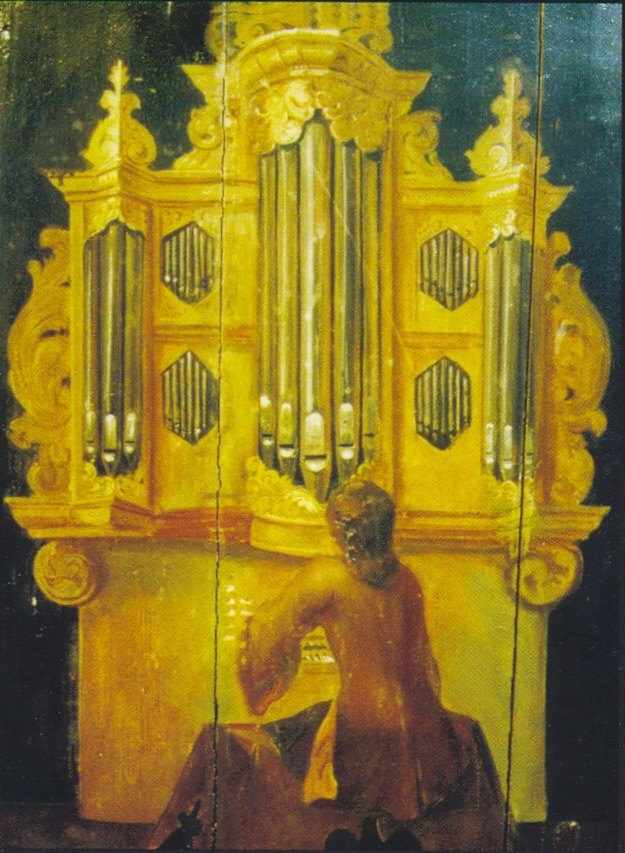
Arp Schnitger died 28 July

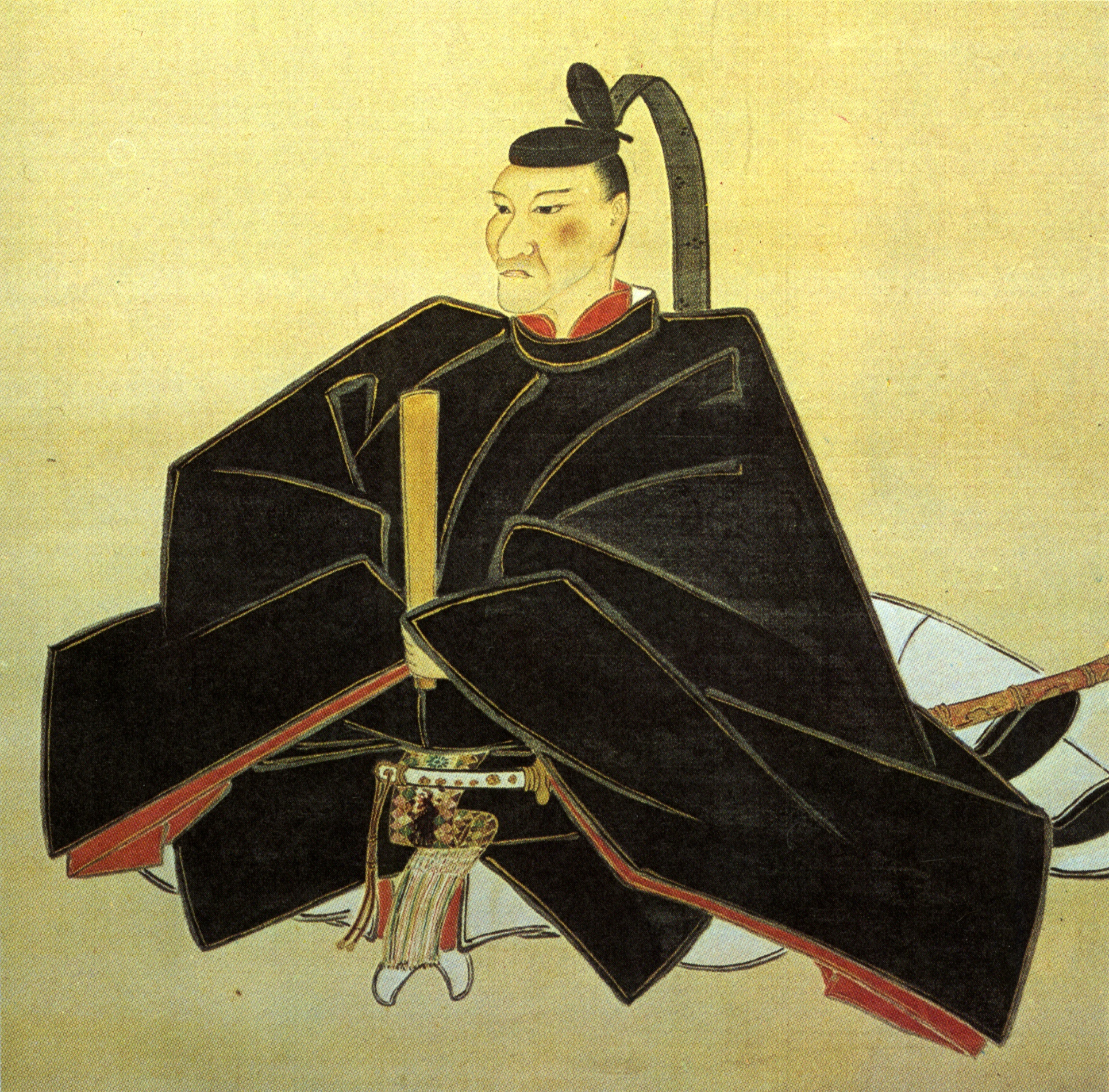
Date Tsunamura died 5 August

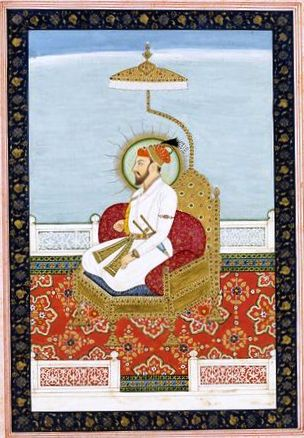
Shah Jahan II died 18 September

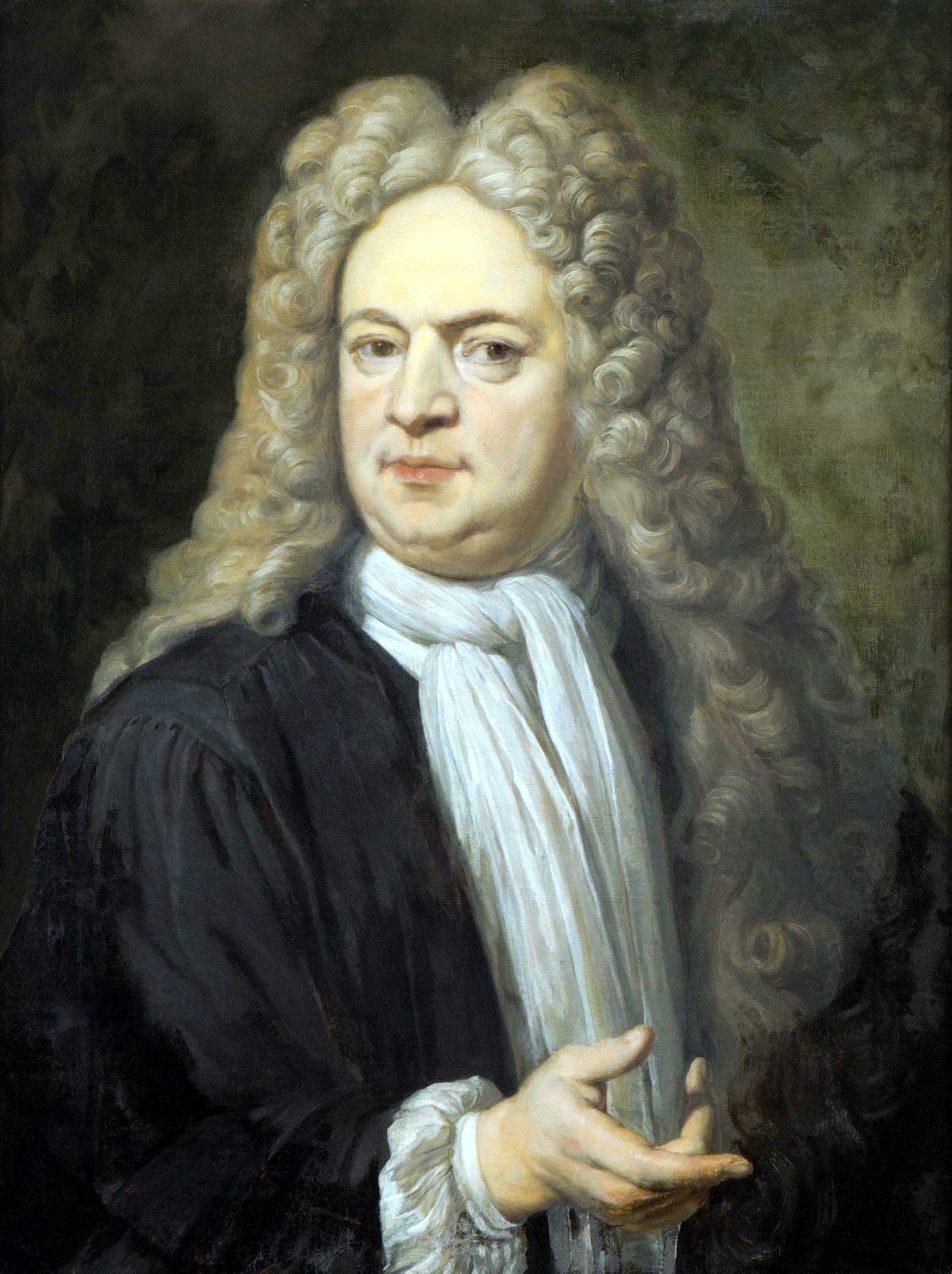
Johannes Jacobus Rau died 18 September

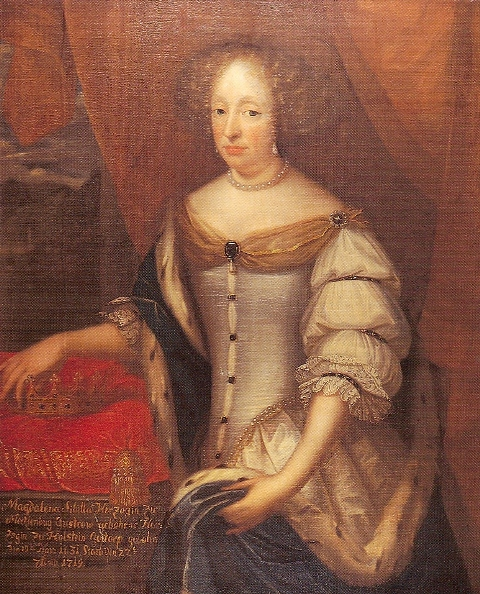
Magdalena Sibylla died 22 September

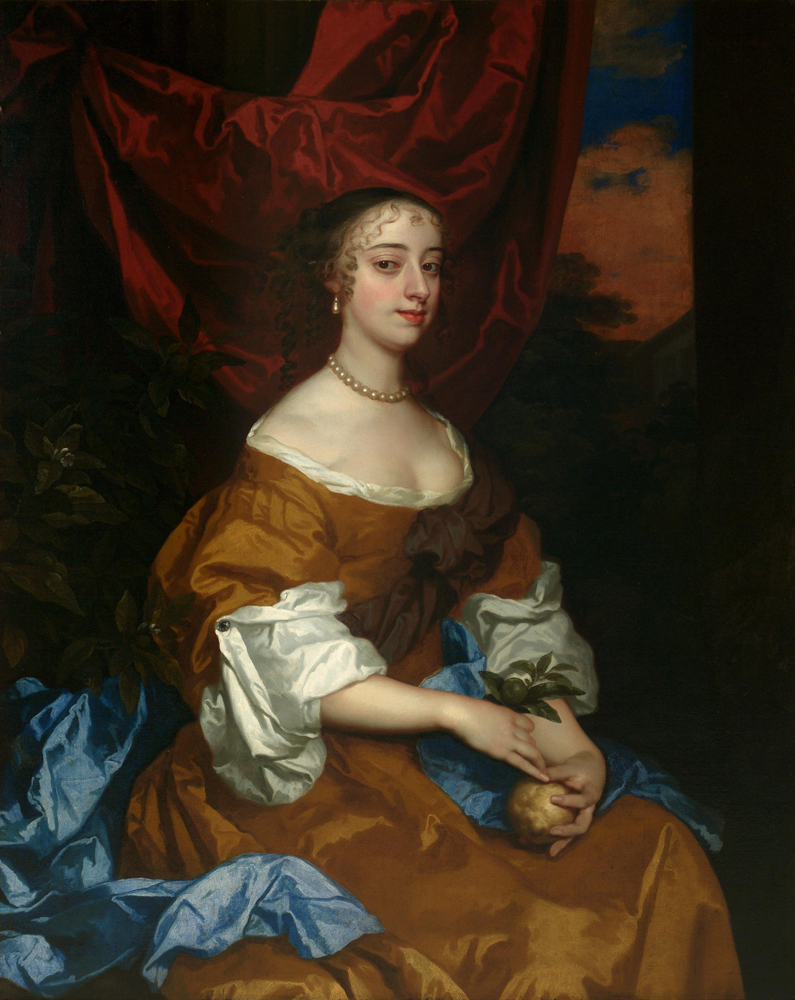
Margaret Hughes died 1 October

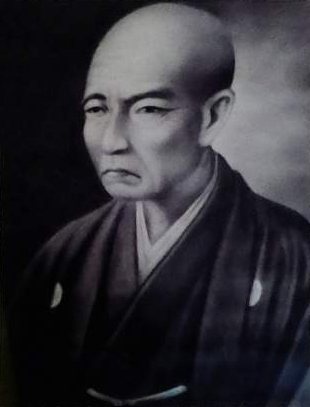
Yamamoto Tsunetomo died 30 November

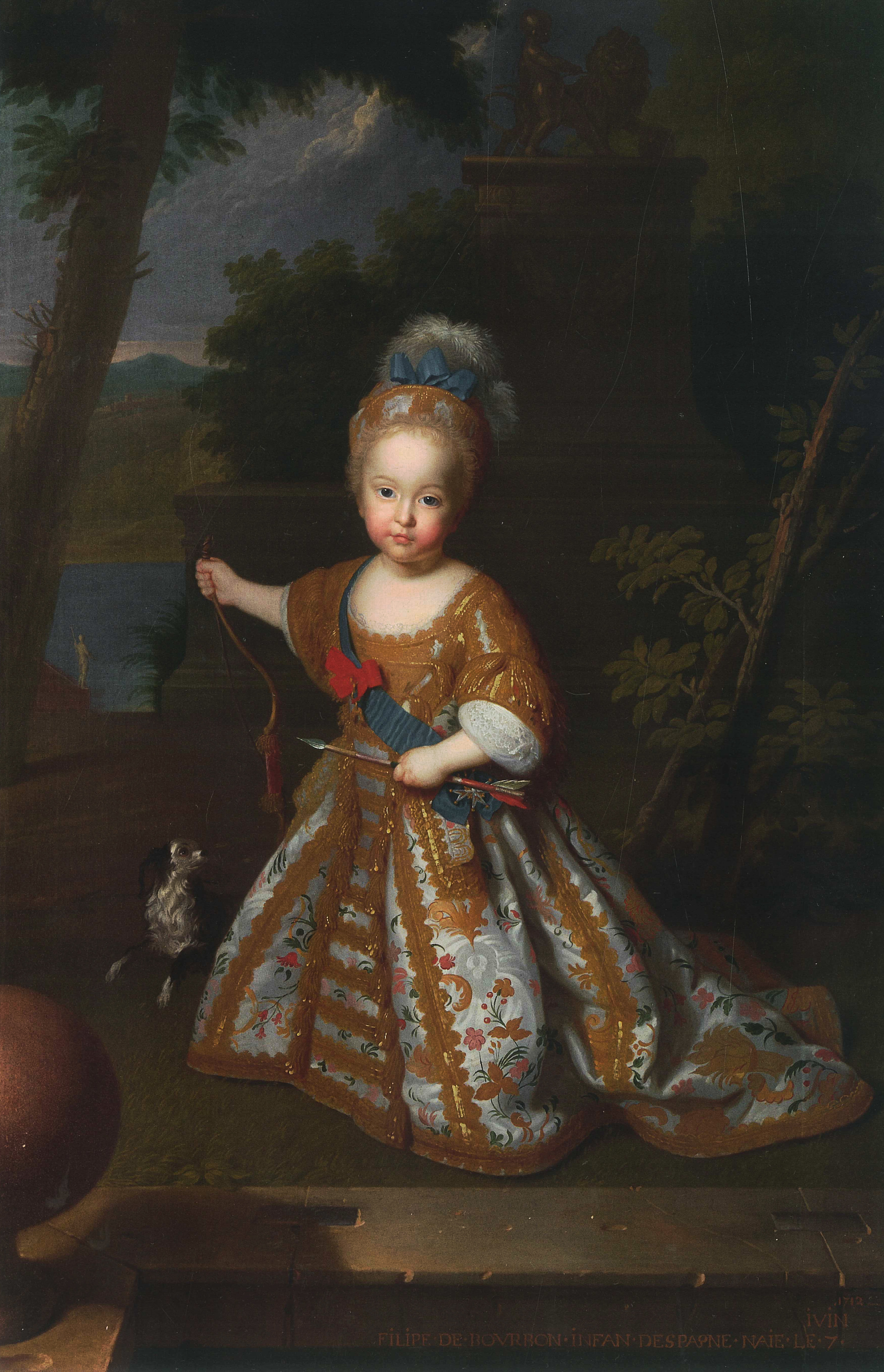
Philip of Spain died 29 December

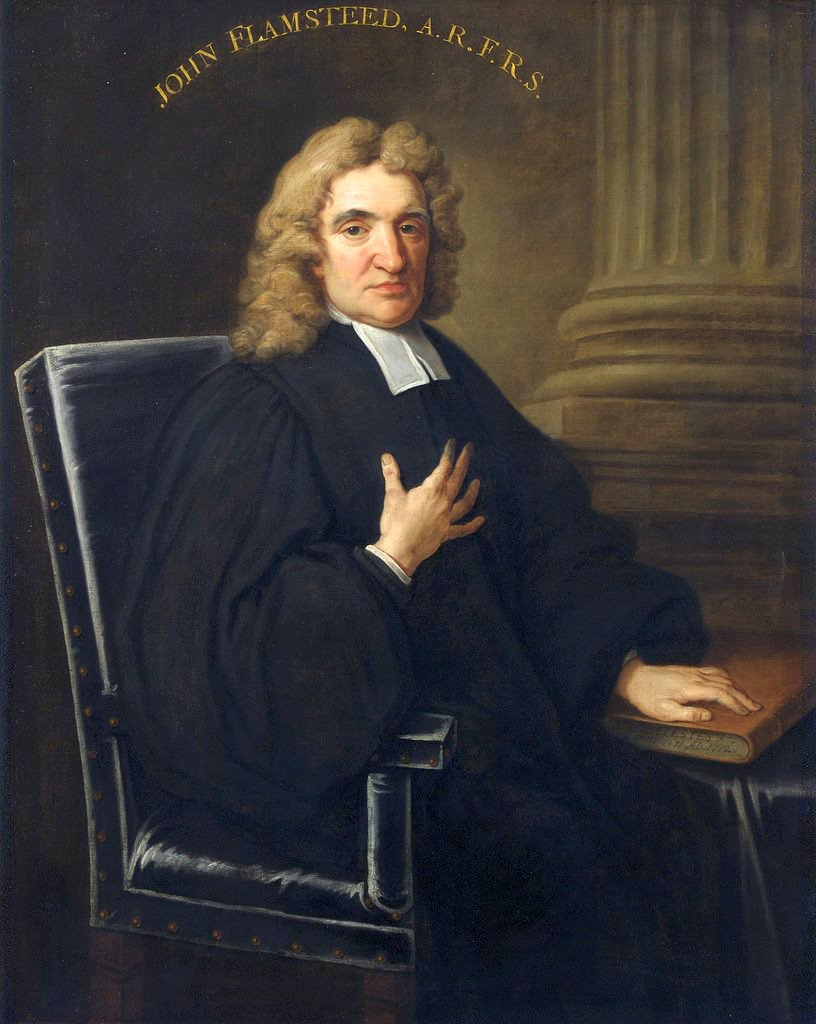
John Flamsteed died 31 December

=== January ===
- January 27 – William Munroe, Scottish soldier (b. 1625)
- January 3 – Jacob Toorenvliet, Dutch painter (b. 1640)
- January 5
  - Carlo Berlingeri, Roman Catholic Archbishop of Santa Severina (b. 1639)
  - Thomas Hay, 7th Earl of Kinnoull, Scottish peer and Conservative politician (b. 1660)
  - Philibert Vigier, French sculptor (b. 1636)
- January 6 – Richard Hoare, banker, founder of C. Hoare & Co. (b. 1648)
- January 11 – Mizoguchi Shigemoto, Japanese daimyō (b. 1680)
- January 16 – Petar Kanavelić, Venetian writer (b. 1637)
- January 17 – Sophie Amalie Moth, royal mistress of King Christian V of Denmark (b. 1654)
- January 18 – Samuel Garth, British writer (b. 1661)
- January 19 – Joachim Tielke, German musical instrument maker (b. 1641)
- January 22
  - William Paterson, Scottish trader and banker (b. 1658)
  - James Winstanley, English Member of Parliament (b. 1667)
- January 26 – Tikhon Streshnev, Russian noble (b. 1644)
- January 27 – Ferdinando d'Adda, Italian Catholic cardinal (b. 1650)

=== February ===
- February 6 – Köprülüzade Numan Pasha, Ottoman Grand Vizier (b. 1670)
- February 12 – Adam Ludwig Lewenhaupt, Swedish general (b. 1659)
- February 14 – Carl Philipp, Reichsgraf von Wylich und Lottum, Prussian field Marshal (b. 1650)
- February 15 – Bernardino Belluzzi, Roman Catholic prelate, Bishop of Camerino (b. 1642)
- February 19
  - Georg Heinrich von Görtz, German politician (b. 1668)
  - Ryer Jacobse Schermerhorn, merchant (b. 1652)
- February 22 – Pakubuwono I of Mataram, Sultan of Mataram (b. 1648)
- February 23 – Bartholomäus Ziegenbalg, German Lutheran clergy (b. 1682)
- February 25 – Giovanni Maria Casini, Italian composer (b. 1652)
- February 27 – Johann Ernst, Count of Nassau-Weilburg (b. 1664)
- February 28 – Boris Sheremetev, Russian noble (b. 1652)

=== March ===
- March 1 – Richard Ingoldesby, British Army officer, lieutenant governor of New York and New Jersey (b. 1617)
- March 3 – Jacques-Louis de Valon, French poet (b. 1659)
- March 7
  - Thomas Butler, 6th Viscount Ikerrin, Irish viscount (b. 1683)
  - Heinrich Bernhard Ruppius, German botanist (b. 1688)
  - Steven Jacobsz Vennekool, Dutch architect (b. 1660)
- March 9 – Peeter van Bredael, Flemish painter (b. 1629)
- March 10 – Jean-Baptiste Alexandre Le Blond, French architect (b. 1679)
- March 12 – Giuseppe Antonio Torricelli, Italian artist (b. 1659)
- March 13 – Johann Friedrich Böttger, Saxon alchemist (b. 1682)
- March 14 – Mary Hamilton, executed Russian lady-in-waiting (b. 1684)
- March 17 – Isaac de Larrey, French historian (b. 1638)
- March 19
  - Isaac Addington, functionary of the colonial government of Massachusetts (b. 1645)
  - Giambattista Spínola Jr., Roman Catholic cardinal (b. 1646)

=== April ===
- April 4 – Thomas Powys, English politician and judge; (b. 1649)
- April 5 – Edward Colston, politician (b. 1670)
- April 7 – Jean-Baptiste de La Salle, French priest, education reformer, saint in the Catholic Church (b. 1651)
- April 14 – Giovanni Tommaso Rovetta, Roman Catholic prelate, Bishop of Hvar (b. 1632)
- April 15 – Françoise d'Aubigné, Marquise de Maintenon, mistress and later secret wife of King Louis XIV of France (b. 1635)
- April 16 – Ketevan of Kakheti, princess (batonishvili) of eastern Georgia (b. 1648)
- April 19
  - Gabriel-Philippe de La Hire, French scientist (b. 1677)
  - Peter Petrovich, Russian Tsarevich, heir to the Russian throne from February 1718 to his death in 1719 (b. 1715)
- April 21
  - Sir Thomas Cave, 3rd Baronet, British politician (b. 1681)
  - Philippe de La Hire, French mathematician and astronomer (b. 1640)
- April 24 – Hyacinthe Robillard d'Avrigny, Jesuit (b. 1675)
- April 27 – Laurentius Christophori Hornæus, Swedish witch hunter (b. 1645)
- April 28 – Farrukhsiyar, Mughal Emperor (b. 1685)

=== May ===
- May 3 – Pierre Le Gros the Younger, sculptor from France (b. 1666)
- May 5 – Prince Yeollyeong, Korean prince (b. 1699)
- May 7 – Sebastiano Bombelli, Italian painter (b. 1635)
- May 13
  - Richard Dyott, English politician; (b. 1667)
  - John Lenton, English composer, violinist, and singer (b. 1657)
- May 21 – Pierre Poiret, French philosopher and mystic (b. 1646)
- May 23
  - Gerhard Treschow, Norwegian businessman (b. 1659)
  - Lucia Wijbrants, Dutch artist (b. 1638)
- May 27 – Thomas Newport, 1st Baron Torrington, British politician and baron (b. 1655)
- May 29
  - Joseph de Jouvancy, French historian (b. 1643)
  - Sir Alexander Seton, 1st Baronet, Scottish baronet (b. 1639)
  - Abraham Trommius, Dutch theologian (b. 1633)
- May 31 – Edmund Dunch, English politician (b. 1657)

=== June ===
- June 2 – Charles Le Goux de La Berchère, French prelate (b. 1647)
- June 5 – Jean-Baptiste Delaveyne, French monk, priest and religious founder (b. 1653)
- June 6
  - Louis Ellies Dupin, French historian and theologian (b. 1657)
  - Rafi ud-Darajat, 10th Mughal Emperor (b. 1699)
- June 7 – John Addenbrooke, English doctor and benefactor (b. 1680)
- June 17
  - Fitzherbert Adams, Academic administrator, clergyman, and benefactor (b. 1651)
  - Joseph Addison, English essayist, poet, playwright and politician (b. 1672)
- June 19
  - Howell Davis, Welsh pirate (b. 1690)
  - Thomas Meredyth, Irish soldier and politician (b. 1660)
- June 20 – Willem Kerricx, Flemish sculptor (b. 1652)
- June 21
  - Jules Louis Bolé, marquis de Chamlay, French diplomat (b. 1650)
  - Domingo de Valencia, Roman Catholic prelate, Bishop of Nueva Caceres (b. 1647)
- June 23 – Christopher Wandesford, 2nd Viscount Castlecomer, Member of Parliament (b. 1684)
- June 26 – Frederick William I, Duke of Schleswig-Holstein-Sonderburg-Beck (b. 1682)

=== July ===
- July 5 – Samuel Schotten, German rabbi (b. 1644)
- July 16
  - James Keill, Scottish physician, philosopher, medical writer and translator (b. 1673)
  - Johann Ulrich Kraus, Illustrator, engraver and publisher (b. 1655)
  - Meinhardt Schomberg, 3rd Duke of Schomberg, English general (b. 1641)
- July 17 – Elinor James, British pamphleteer (b. 1644)
- July 19 – Anna Katharina Block, German Baroque (b. 1642)
- July 21
  - Robert Clicquot, French pipeorgan builder (b. 1645)
  - Marie Louise Élisabeth d'Orléans, French princess (b. 1695)
- July 22
  - Heneage Finch, 1st Earl of Aylesford, English lawyer and politician (b. 1649)
  - Giovanni Gioseffo dal Sole, Italian painter and engraver (b. 1654)
- July 27 – Cornelis de Graeff II., Lords of Purmerland and Ilpendam (b. 1671)
- July 28 – Arp Schnitger, German organ builder (b. 1648)
- July 30 – Giambattista Felice Zappi, poet from Italy (b. 1667)

=== August ===
- August 2 – Karol Stanisław Radziwiłł, Polish prince (b. 1669)
- August 3 – Johann Philipp von Greifenclau zu Vollraths, Prince-Bishop of Wurzburg (b. 1652)
- August 5 – Date Tsunamura, Japanese daimyō at the center of the Date Sōdō (b. 1659)
- August 7 – Richard Farington, English politician (b. 1644)
- August 8 – Christoph Ludwig Agricola, German painter (b. 1667)
- August 9 – Charles Middleton, 2nd Earl of Middleton, English and Scottish politician (b. 1649)
- August 11 – Leonard Goffiné, German Catholic priest and writer (b. 1648)
- August 14 – Alexander Grant, Scottish army officer (b. 1674)
- August 18 – Heinrich von Cocceji, German scholar (b. 1644)
- August 19 – Carl Hildebrand von Canstein, German theologian, jurist and writer (b. 1667)
- August 30 – Daniel Cronström, Swedish architect (b. 1655)

=== September ===
- September 7 – John Harris, English writer, scientist, Anglican priest (b. 1666)
- September 8 – Carlo Cignani, Italian painter (b. 1628)
- September 16 – Henrich Danckwardt, Swedish military personnel (b. 1670)
- September 18
  - Shah Jahan II, Mughal emperor (b. 1696)
  - Johannes Jacobus Rau, German physician (b. 1668)
- September 19
  - Frans Anneessens, leader of a Brussels guild, decapitated for involvement in uprisings (b. 1660)
  - Jan Weenix, Dutch painter (b. 1642)
- September 21 – Johann Heinrich Acker, German historian (b. 1647)
- September 22
  - Magdalena Sibylla of Holstein-Gottorp, Duchess of Holstein-Gottorp (b. 1631)
  - Hans Schack, 2nd Count of Schackenborg, Danish nobleman (b. 1676)
- September 25 – Michel Félibien, French historian and writer (b. 1665)
- September 27 – George Smalridge, English Bishop of Bristol (b. 1662)
- September 29 – Jean Orry, French economist (b. 1652)

=== October ===
- October 1 – Margaret Hughes, British actress (b. 1630)
- October 3 – Johann Gregor Thalnitscher, Carniolan lawyer, scholar of ancient inscriptions, chronicler, historian (b. 1655)
- October 7 – Pierre Remond de Montmort, French mathematician (b. 1678)
- October 9 – Charles Louis Bretagne de La Trémoille, French noble (b. 1683)
- October 11
  - Samuel Jones, English Dissenter and tutor (b. 1681)
  - Fernando Manuel de Bustillo Bustamante y Rueda, Spanish Field Marshal (b. 1663)
- October 14 – Arnold Houbraken, painter from the Northern Netherlands (b. 1660)
- October 15 – Jan Mortel, painter from the Northern Netherlands (b. 1652)
- October 25 – Catharina Wallenstedt, Swedish writer and courtier (b. 1627)
- October 26 – Laurens van der Meulen, Flemish sculptor (b. 1643)
- October 27 – François Baert, Belgian hagiographer (b. 1651)
- October 28
  - Jean Baptiste Bissot, Sieur de Vincennes, French-Canadian explorer and soldier (b. 1668)
  - Martinus Nellius, Dutch Golden Age painter (b. 1621)

=== November ===
- November 2 – Georg Johann Mattarnovi, German architect (b. 1677)
- November 3 – Jan Claesz Rietschoof, Dutch Golden Age painter (b. 1652)
- November 8 – Michel Rolle, French mathematician (b. 1652)
- November 9 – Oley Douglas, British Member of Parliament (b. 1684)
- November 19 – Charles-Claude Genest, French dramatist and playwright (b. 1639)
- November 22 – William Talman, British architect; (b. 1650)
- November 23 – John Mavrocordatos, Phanariote Prince (b. 1684)
- November 26 – John Hudson, English classical scholar (b. 1662)
- November 30 – Yamamoto Tsunetomo, Japanese samurai (b. 1659)

=== December ===
- December 2 – Pasquier Quesnel, French Jansenist theologian (b. 1634)
- December 3 – Adriaen Frans Boudewijns, Flemish painter and engraver (b. 1644)
- December 8 – Ulrik Christian Gyldenløve, Count of Samsø, Danish nobleman and admiral (b. 1678)
- December 9 – Charles Oliphant, British physician (b. 1666)
- December 11
  - Chatan Chōai, sessei of Ryukyu (b. 1650)
  - Stefano Cupilli, Roman Catholic Archbishop of Split (b. 1659)
- December 15 – Mitford Crowe, English politician (b. 1669)
- December 24 – William O'Brien, 3rd Earl of Inchiquin, Irish Earl (b. 1662)
- December 28 – Jacob Bobart the Younger, English botanist (b. 1641)
- December 29 – Philip of Spain, Spanish Royal infante (b. 1712)
- December 30 – Lord James Murray, British politician (b. 1663)
- December 31 – John Flamsteed, English astronomer and the first Astronomer Royal (b. 1646)
- date unknown
  - Robert Clicquot, French organ builder (b. 1645)
  - Benjamin Hornigold, English pirate (b. 1680)
  - André Raison, French composer and organist (b. 1650)
  - Adam Ludwig Lewenhaupt, Swedish general (b. 1659)
