= François Poulletier de la Salle =

French doctor and chemist (1719–1788)

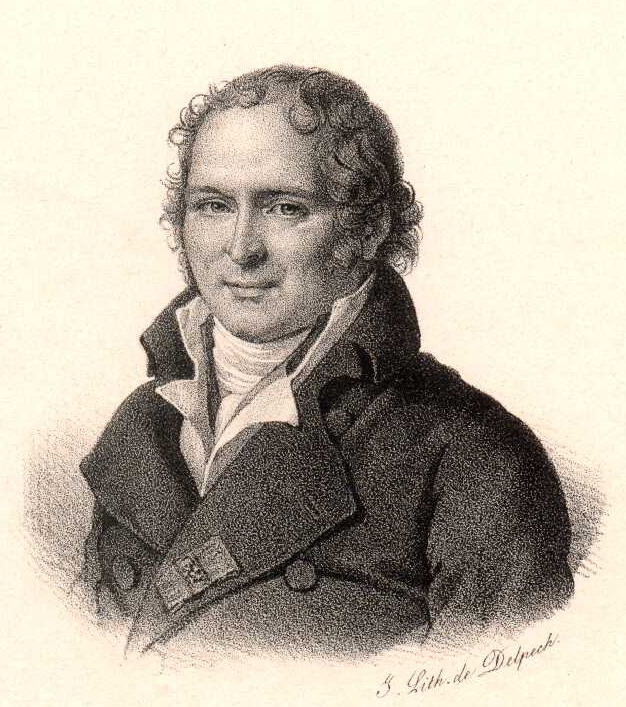

François Poulletier de la Salle (30 September 1719 in Lyon – 20 March 1788 in Paris) was a French medical doctor and chemist. In about 1758, he isolated for the first time the crystals from cholesterol. As his work was never published, attribution and the dating are known only roughly, but they were quoted by his collaborators, in particular Pierre-Joseph Macquer and Felix Vicq-d'Azyr.
