= Martinus Nellius =

Dutch Golden Age still life painter

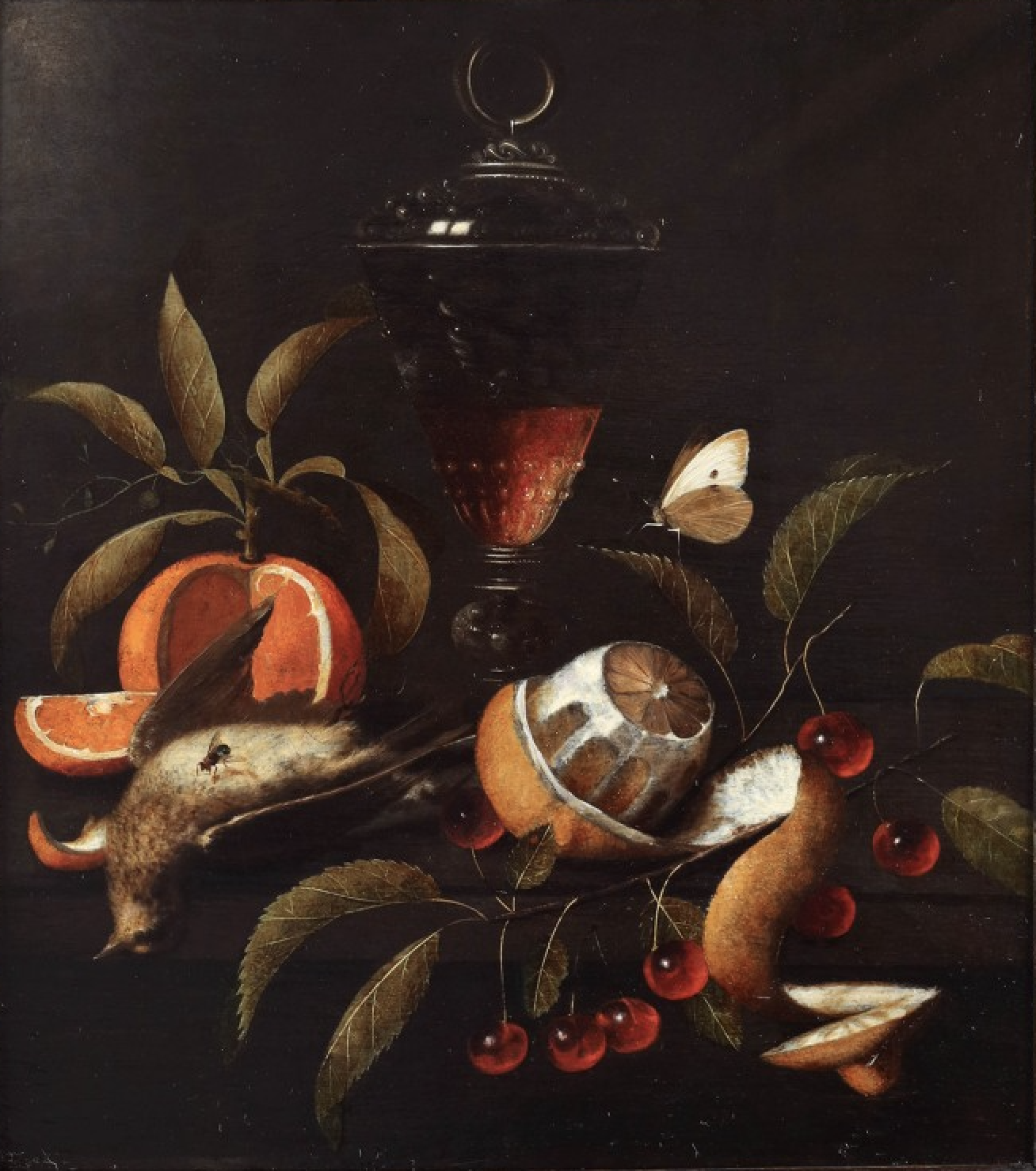
Still life with a wine glass, a cut orange, cherries and a dead bird

Still life

Martinus Nellius (1621 – 1719) was a Dutch Golden Age still life painter.

== Biography ==
According to the RKD it is unknown where he was born, but he is first registered in Leiden in 1674 and from 1676 in The Hague, where he later died. Dated works are known during the period 1671 to 1712.
