= Pierre Sigorgne =

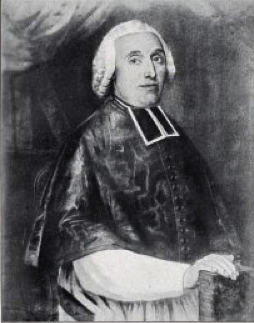

Abbé Pierre Sigorgne (24 October 1719 – 10 November 1809) was a French educator, science popularizer, abbot and theologian. He replaced some of the ideas of Descartes with those of Newton and published a book on Newton's ideas in 1747.

Sigorgne was born in Rembercourt-aux-Pots, the namesake son of a court official and his wife Marguerite. He was educated at Sorbonne and taught philosophy at the College du Plessis from 1740 and was popular for introducing Newtonian ideas into France. In 1749 he was arrested for writing satire on Louis XV and Madame de Pompadour. He was held under arrest in the Bastille and later exiled out of Paris to Mâcon where he was one of the founders of the Mâcon Academy. He was an abbot at Bonnevaux from 1774 to 1790.
