= Daniel Nettelbladt =

German jurist and philosopher (1719–1791)

Daniel Nettelbladt (14 January 1719 in Rostock – 4 September 1791 in Halle) was a German jurist and philosopher.

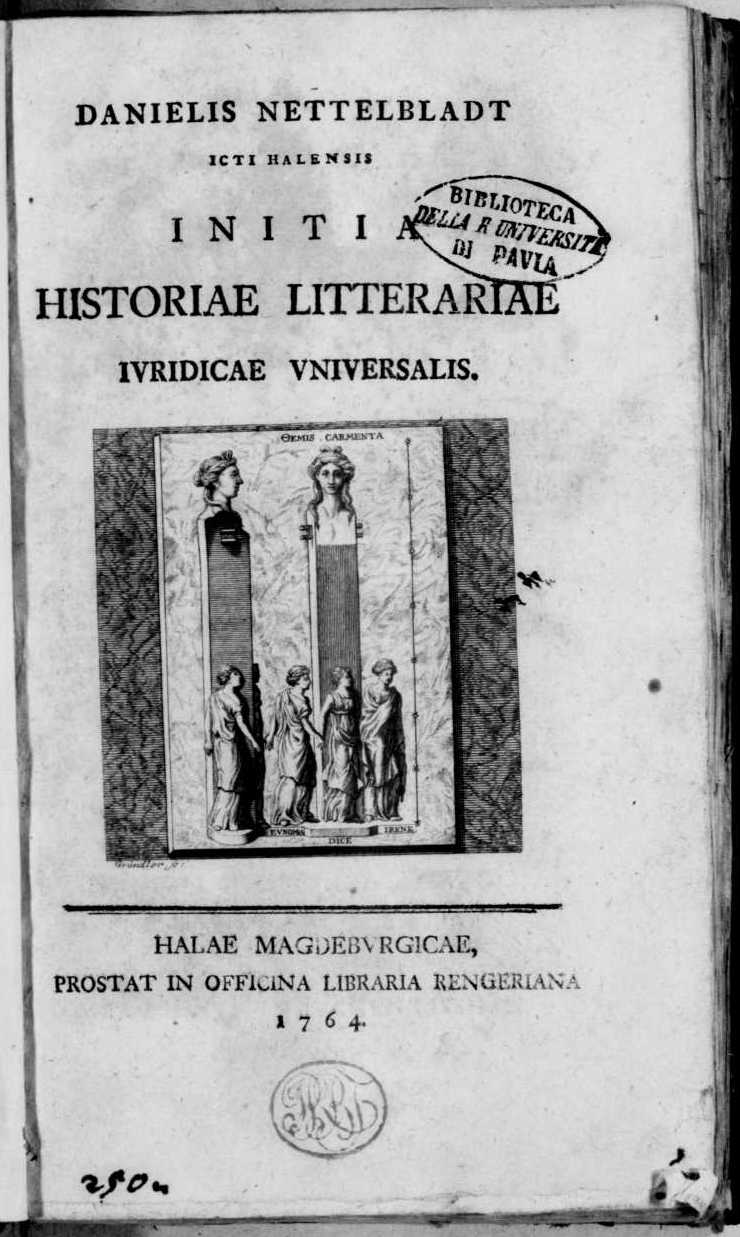
Initia historiae litterariae iuridicae universalis, 1764

Nettelbladt studied theology and law at the universities of Rostock, Marburg and Halle, where he became a doctor of law in 1744. In 1746 he became a full professor of jurisprudence in Halle, and a royal Prussian privy aulic councillor.

== Works ==
- Systema elementare Jurisprudentiae naturalis, 1749
- Historie der demonstrativischen Rechtsgelehrtheit, von ihrem Anfang bis auf das Jahr 1745, 1754
- Initia historiae litterariae iuridicae universalis (in Latin). Halle: Johann Gottfried Renger. 1764.
