= Christian Gottfried Krause =

German lawyer, composer and music commentator

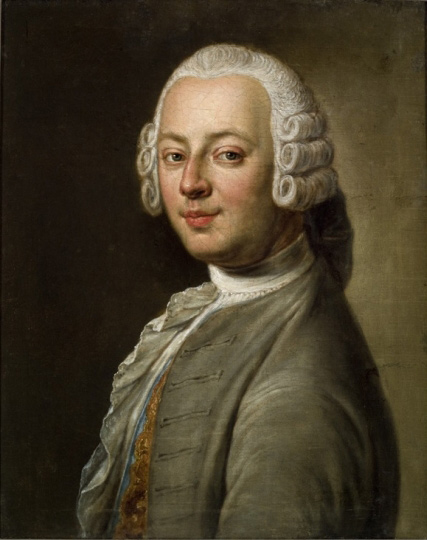
Christian Gottfried Krause, painting by Gottfried Hempel, 1752, Gleimhaus Halberstadt

Christian Gottfried Krause (17 April 1717 – 4 May 1770) was a German lawyer, composer and music commentator.

== Life ==
Krause was born in Winzig (today Wińsko, Poland) into a musical family. His father was a Stadtpfeifer from whom he learned to play the flute, violin, keyboard and timpani. Krause studied law at the University in Frankfurt an der Oder, where he attended lectures by Alexander Gottlieb Baumgarten, among others. Baumgarten's ideas on aesthetic had a profound influence on Krause. In 1746 he moved to Berlin, where he died.

Krause's treatise Von der musikalischen Poesie (1753) marked the beginning of the Ersten Berliner Liederschule (first Berlin Lieder School).

== Musical works ==
- Gelobet sey der Herr (Cantata) 1758
- Der Tod Jesu (Cantata, text by Karl Wilhelm Ramler) 1758
- Oden mit Melodien 1761
- Der lustige Schulmeister (Singspiel, text by Friedrich Nicolai) 1766
- Lieder der deutschen mit Melodien in four volumes 1767-8

Krause's instrumental output includes a small amount of chamber music, orchestral sinfonias and partitas and keyboard works. There are also numerous pieces listed in 18th century catalogues which have not survived.

== Literary works ==
- Lettre à Mr. le Marquis de B. sur la difference de la Musique Italienne et la musique Francaise 1748
- Von der musikalischen Poesie 1752
