= Daniel Dupuy =

American silversmith

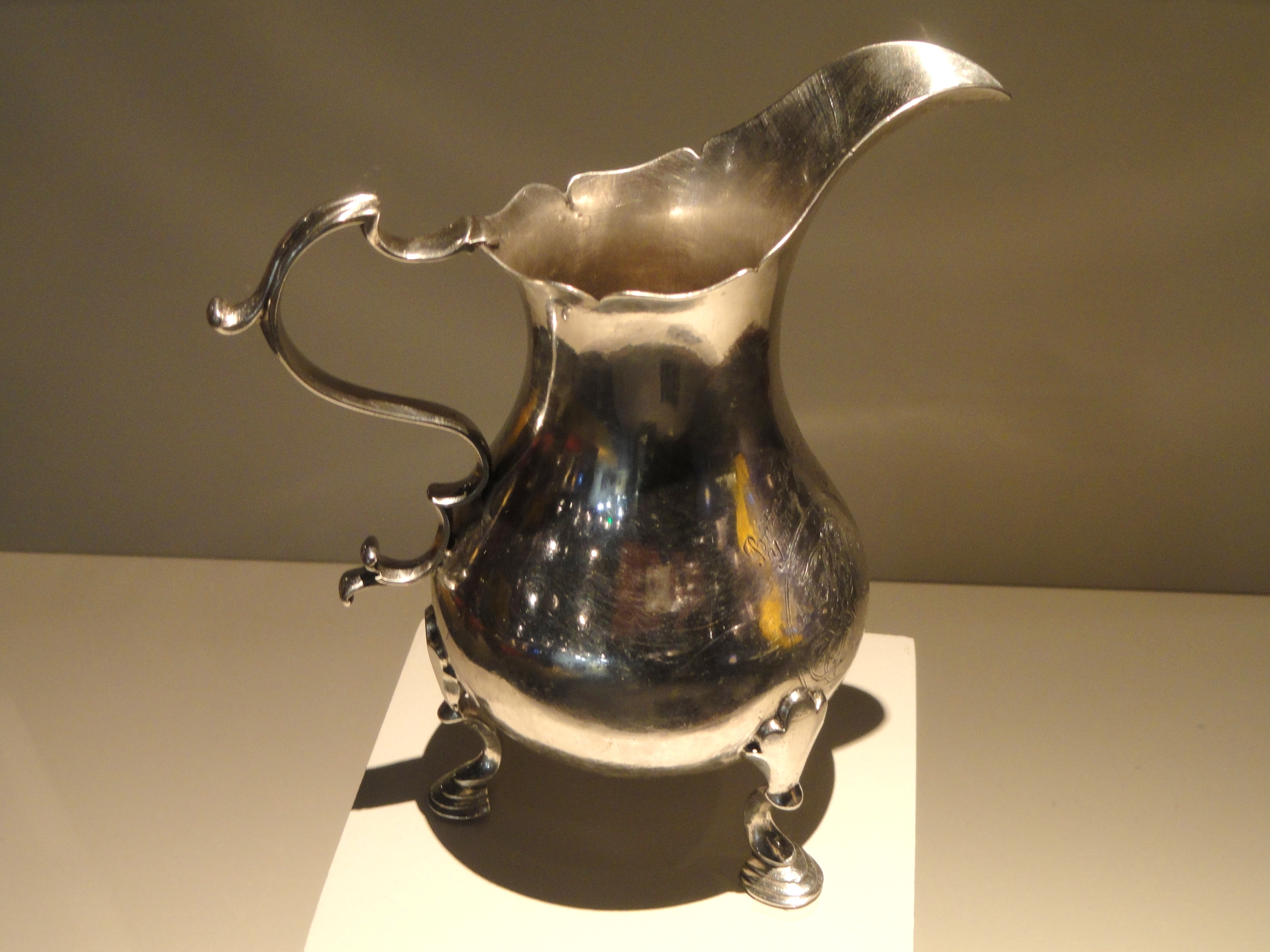
Silver milk pot by Daniel Dupuy, Philadelphia, c. 1774

Daniel Dupuy, Sr., (April 3, 1719 – August 30, 1807) was an American silversmith who was active from 1745 to 1805 in Philadelphia. He was born as the fourth child of Dr. John and Anne (Chardavoine) Dupuy, Huguenots, in New York City, and apprenticed in 1740 to his brother-in-law, Peter David, in Philadelphia. He married Eleanor Cox on September 6, 1746, in Philadelphia, and with her had six children, including silversmith Daniel Dupuy, Jr. Dupuy's works are collected in the Metropolitan Museum of Art, the National Museum of American History, Winterthur, the Yale University Museum, and elsewhere.

== Additional sources ==
- A Genealogical History of the Dupuy Family, Charles Meredith Du Puy, privately published, 1910, pages 19 and 23–32.
- Rambo Family Tree: Descendents of His Last Four Children and Rambos of Unknown Ancestry, Ronald S. Beatty, AuthorHouse, 2009, pages E-74 to E-76 include Dupuy's will.
- Catalogue of an exhibition of American paintings, furniture, silver and other objects of art, MDCXXV-MDCCCXXV, Henry Watson Kent and Florence N. Levy, Metropolitan Museum of Art, 1909, page 101.
- Rootsweb entry
- Online Encyclopedia of Silver Marks, Hallmarks, & Makers' Marks
