= Hyacinthe Robillard d'Avrigny =

Hyacinthe Robillard d'Avrigny (1675, Caen – 24 April 1719) was a French Jesuit.

A witty writer and historian, he is best known as the anonymous author of Mémoires chronologiques et dogmatiques : pour servir à l’histoire ecclésiastique depuis 1600 jusqu'en 1716, which focuses upon the history of the Society of Jesus.

Robillard d'Avrigny wrote of Fenelon, praising the Quietist human rights advocate as a "victim and martyr of pure love".

He was also the author of Mémoires pour servir à l’histoire universelle de l’Europe, depuis 1600 jusqu’en 1716. Avec des réflexions & remarques critiques.

== Works ==
- Mémoires chronologiques et dogmatiques : pour servir à l’histoire ecclésiastique depuis 1600 jusqu'en 1716; avec des réflexions & des remarques critiques, Nîmes, Pierre Beaume, 1781
- Mémoires pour servir à l’histoire universelle de l’Europe, depuis 1600 jusqu’en 1716. Avec des réflexions & remarques critiques, Paris, Veuve R. Mazières, 1724-1725.
