= Peritoneal ligament =

Folds of peritoneum

Peritoneal ligaments are folds of peritoneum that are used to connect viscera to viscera or the abdominal wall.

There are multiple named ligaments that usually are named in accordance with what they are.

- Gastrocolic ligament, connects the stomach and the colon.
- Splenocolic ligament, connects the spleen and the colon.
- Gastrosplenic ligament
- Gastrophrenic ligament
- Phrenicocolic ligament
- Splenorenal ligament
- Hepatic ligaments - Ligaments that are associated with the liver
  - Coronary ligament
  - Left triangular ligament
  - Right triangular ligament
  - Hepatoduodenal ligament
  - Hepatogastric ligament
  - Falciform ligament
  - Round ligament of liver
