= Hepatic ligaments =

Hepatic ligaments may refer to:

- Coronary ligament of the liver
- Falciform ligament
- Hepatoduodenal ligament
- Hepatogastric ligament
- Hepatophrenic ligament
- Hepatorenal ligament
- Round ligament of liver
