= Foramen =

Enclosed gap within dense connective tissue (bones or deep fascia)

In anatomy and osteology, a foramen (/fəˈreɪmən/; pl.: foramina, /fəˈræmɪnə/ or foramens /fəˈreɪmənz/; from Latin 'an opening produced by boring') is an opening or enclosed gap within the dense connective tissue (bones and deep fasciae) of extant and extinct amniote animals, typically to allow passage of nerves, arteries, veins or other soft tissue structures (e.g. muscle tendon) from one body compartment to another.

== Skull ==
The skulls of vertebrates have foramina through which nerves, arteries, veins, and other structures pass. The human skull has many foramina, collectively referred to as the cranial foramina.

== Spine ==
Within the vertebral column (spine) of vertebrates, including the human spine, each bone has an opening at both its top and bottom to allow nerves, arteries, veins, etc. to pass through.

== Other ==
- Apical foramen, the hole at the tip of the root of a tooth
- Foramen ovale (heart), a hole between the venous and arterial sides of the fetal heart
- Transverse foramen, one of a pair of openings in each cervical vertebra, in which the vertebral artery travels
- Greater sciatic foramen, a major foramen of the pelvis
- Interventricular foramina, channels connecting ventricles in the brain
- Lesser sciatic foramen, an opening between the pelvis and the posterior thigh
- Obturator foramen, the hole created by the ischium and pubis bones of the pelvis
- Omental foramen, the connecting opening between the greater sac and the lesser sac in the abdominal cavity
- Sacral foramina, which perforate the vertebral canal from the Sacrum (sacral bone), and through which the sacral nerves pass
- Vertebral foramen, the foramen formed by the anterior segment (the body), and the posterior part, the vertebral arch
- Foramen of Panizza, a hole connecting two aortas just after they leave the heart in crocodiles

== See also ==
- Eta Carinae
- Fossa (disambiguation)
- Skeleton
- Foraminifera
