= Exploratory laparotomy =

Surgical abdominal examination operation

- ICD-10-PCS: 0WJG0ZZ
- ICD-9-CM: 54.11
- MeSH: = OPS301 =

An exploratory laparotomy, informally known as ex-lap, is a general surgical operation where the abdomen is opened and the abdominal organs are examined for injury or disease. It is the standard of care in various blunt and penetrating trauma situations in which there may be life-threatening internal injuries. It is also used in certain diagnostic situations, in which the operation is undertaken in search of a unifying cause for multiple signs and symptoms of disease, and in the staging of some cancers.

During an exploratory laparotomy, a large incision is made vertically in the middle of the abdomen to access the peritoneal cavity, then each of the quadrants of the abdomen is examined. Various other maneuvers, such as the Kocher maneuver, or other procedures may be performed concurrently. Overall operative mortality ranges between 10% and 20% worldwide for emergent exploratory laparotomies. Recovery typically involves a prolonged hospital stay, sometimes in the intensive care unit, and may include rehabilitation with one or more therapies.

== Indications ==
A database that tracks exploratory laparotomies performed in the United Kingdom estimates that about 30,000 are done across England and Wales each year out of a population of 59.5 million people. Reasons why a patient may require an exploratory laparotomy include:

- Acute blunt or penetrating trauma with evidence of internal bleeding (a positive focused assessment with sonography for trauma, diagnostic peritoneal lavage, or CT scan), unstable blood pressure, or evisceration
- Acute abdomen with evidence of inflammation of the abdominal lining or the abdominal organs, gastrointestinal bleeding, or gastrointestinal perforation
- Cancer staging, especially ovarian cancer and Hodgkin and non-Hodgkin lymphoma
- Inability to access the part of the abdomen where a surgical disease is using a less invasive approach, or a lack of laparoscopic equipment, technology, or training

== Procedure ==
=== General technique ===
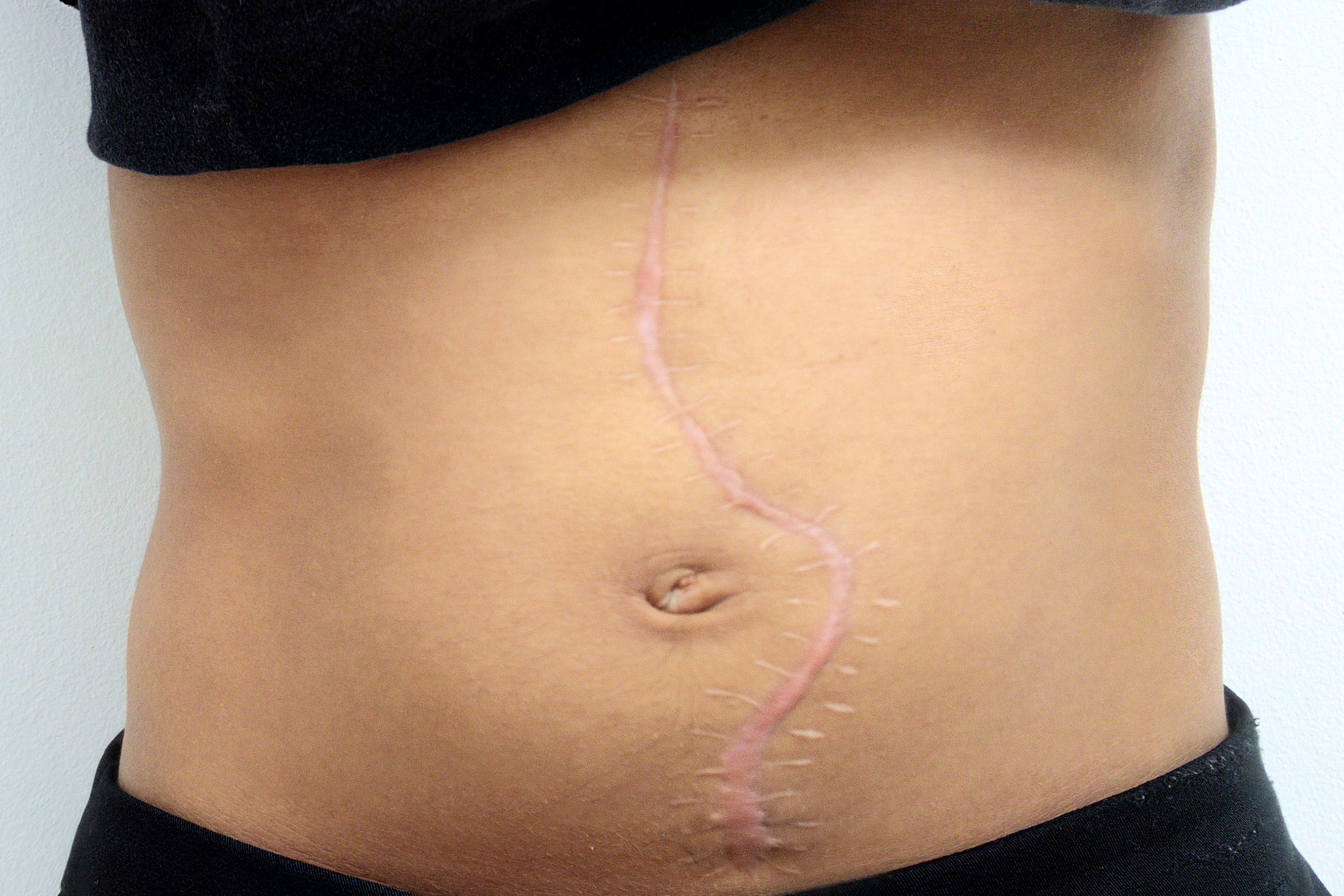
Scar from midline incision for exploratory laparotomy (the incision skirted the umbilicus to the left so as to spare the round ligament of liver).

A vertical cut, or incision, is made in the middle of the abdomen. This midline incision extends from the xiphoid process at the bottom of the chest to the pubic symphysis at the bottom of the pelvis. The fibrous tissue of the linea alba, which separates the right and the left abdominal muscles, serves as a guide for where to cut. After opening the fascia, the abdominal cavity, or peritoneum, is entered. The surgeon then looks for evidence of injury, infection, or disease. In trauma exploratory laparotomy, any immediate, life-threatening bleeding is first identified and controlled. In these cases, sponges are often packed in the spaces around the liver and the spleen to slow bleeding until a source can be found. This allows the surgeon to focus on one area at a time by removing the sponges from that quadrant.

A systematic approach is taken to examining the abdominal organs for disease. The small bowel is "run", or looked at segment by segment, along its entire length from the ligament of Treitz to the terminal ileum. The gastrocolic ligament is incised and the lesser sac is explored, including the posterior stomach and the anterior pancreas. The surfaces of the spleen and the liver also are examined for injury. If being performed for cancer staging, special attention will be paid during the exploratory laparotomy to the lymph nodes, which may be biopsied, or removed and assessed with a microscope or other special tests to see whether they contain cancerous cells indicative of cancer spread.

If necessary, several other surgical maneuvers or procedures may be performed.

=== Additional maneuvers ===
	Definition	Purpose	Structures mobilized	Structures exposed
Mattox maneuver ("left medial visceral rotation")	surgical maneuver named for Dr. Kenneth Mattox in which left-sided abdominal organs are mobilized and moved temporarily out of the way	to provide access to deeper retroperitoneal left-sided abdominal structures	stomach, pancreatic tail, spleen, left kidney, left hemicolon	aorta, left iliac vessels, left renal vessels, pelvic vessels
Cattell-Braasch maneuver ("right medial visceral rotation")	surgical maneuver named for Dr. Richard Cattell and Dr. John Braasch in which right-sided abdominal organs are mobilized and moved temporarily out of the way	to provide access to deeper retroperitoneal right-sided abdominal structures	duodenum, pancreatic head, right hemicolon	inferior vena cava, portal vein, right iliac vessels, right renal vessels
Kocher maneuver	surgical maneuver named for Dr. Emil Theodor Kocher in which the duodenum and the head of the pancreas are mobilized and moved out of the way to the left	to fully inspect the duodenum and the pancreas and to access deeper structures behind them	duodenum, pancreatic head	aorta, inferior vena cava, posterior duodenum, posterior pancreas

=== Additional procedures ===
Based on where and what injury or disease is identified, one or more additional procedures may be performed during an exploratory laparotomy, including:

- splenectomy, or removal of all or part of the spleen
- hepatectomy, or removal of all or part of the liver
- pericardial window, in which an opening is made in the sac surrounding the heart
- repairs of the vena cava
- repairs of the aorta
- repairs of the common, external, or internal iliac arteries or common, external, or internal iliac veins
- distal pancreatectomy, or removal of the body or the tail of the pancreas
- enterotomy and bowel repair or bowel resection
- right or left hemicolectomy
- pyloric exclusion and gastric diversion, in which gastric secretions are diverted away from the duodenum by closing the pylorus and creating a new connection between the stomach and the small intestine
- nephrectomy, or removal of all or part of a kidney
- the "trauma Whipple"

Depending on the stability of the patient following an exploratory laparotomy, the abdomen may be sutured back together ("primary closure") or one or more tissue layers may be left open ("open abdomen") to facilitate further non-surgical resuscitation. In cases where the abdomen is left open, a vacuum dressing, a saline bag, or towel clips may be placed to protect the internal organs until the patient is stable enough to return to the operating room for definitive closure.

== Outcomes ==
=== Postoperative mortality ===
The likelihood of death after an exploratory laparotomy depends on several factors including the age of the patient, injury or disease severity, other comorbid medical conditions, the skill of the surgeon, and what resources are available in the hospital. Overall, the mortality rate typically ranges between 10% and 20% worldwide for emergent exploratory laparotomies. It is lower for scheduled (elective) exploratory laparotomies, since patients are typically less sick and more optimized when procedures are able to be planned ahead of time.

=== Postoperative complications ===
Like with any major surgery, a variety of complications may occur during and after an exploratory laparotomy. These include minor problems, such as superficial skin infection or delayed bowel motility, and major problems, such as bleeding, blood clots in the legs or in the lungs, stroke, deep intraabdominal infection which can lead to sepsis, and reopening of the wound due to a failure to heal properly. A minority of patients will require reoperation for complications of exploratory laparotomy.

== Recovery ==
Most patients spend at least several days in the hospital after having an exploratory laparotomy, sometimes in the intensive care unit, depending on the severity of the injury, infection, or disease. It can take weeks or months to heal completely. During the recovery period, there may be restrictions on activities such as driving, exercising, lifting, swimming, and showering. Depending on how long they were in the hospital, how severe their illness was, and whether they sustained other injuries or complications, some patients may require rehabilitation with physical therapy, occupational therapy, or speech-language pathology.

== History ==
Exploratory laparotomy originated as a technique for the treatment of acute trauma. In 1881, Dr. George E. Goodfellow performed the first documented exploratory laparotomy for a ballistic injury, however the use of the procedure for blunt trauma had been described previously. In 1888, Dr. Henry O. Marcy first discussed using exploratory laparotomy as a means of diagnosing acute nontraumatic abdominal and pelvic problems at the 39th Annual Meeting of the American Medical Association, citing how improvements in safe surgical methods "so greatly increased the utility of the operation". Since the early 2000s, the opposite trend has been seen thanks to improvements in laboratory testing; CT, MRI, and other medical imaging; and less invasive laparoscopic surgical techniques, all of which have made exploratory laparotomy less common for diagnostic purposes outside of the severe trauma setting.

== See also ==
Exploratory thoracotomy
