= Abdominal tuberculosis =

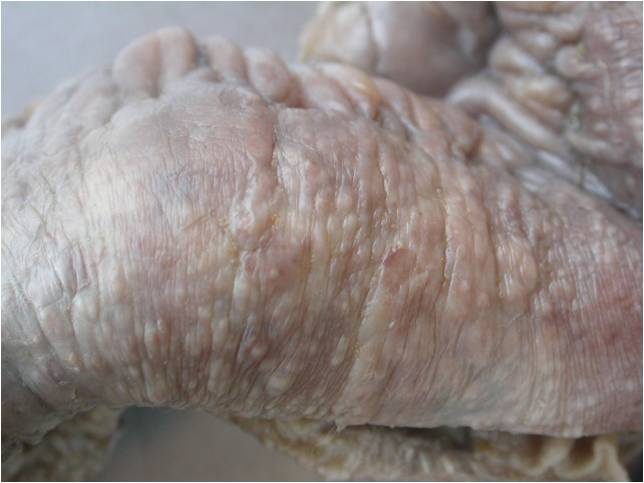
- Tuberculosis of the ileum showing serosal tubercles
- Specialty: Infectious disease

Abdominal tuberculosis is a type of extrapulmonary tuberculosis which involves the abdominal organs such as intestines, peritoneum and abdominal lymph nodes. It can either occur in isolation or along with a primary focus (such as the lungs) in patients with disseminated tuberculosis.

== Types ==
- Tubercular lymphadenopathy: Abdominal lymphadenopathy is the most common manifestation of abdominal tuberculosis. The commonly involved lymph nodes are mesenteric nodes and omental nodes. They usually have central areas of caseous necrosis.
- Peritoneal tuberculosis: Peritoneal tuberculosis most often presents as abdominal pain and ascites. It can occur most commonly following re-activation of a latent focus of tuberculosis.
- Intestinal tuberculosis: Tuberculosis of the intestine can affect multiple areas of the bowel simultaneously. The bacilli penetrate the mucosa, cause caseous necrosis and scarring.
- Hepatic tuberculosis: Hepatic tuberculosis can present as miliary hepatic tuberculosis and local hepatic tuberculosis. The proportion of hepatic involvement in disseminated tuberculosis is around 20 percent.
- Other rare sites, such as genitourinary system, duodenum, esophagus, stomach, spleen. The commonest route of spread to these organs is hematogenous.

== Symptoms and signs ==
The symptoms of abdominal tuberculosis depends on the sites of involvement. The most common symptoms and signs of abdominal tuberculosis are abdominal pain, ascites and intestinal obstruction. Other clinical features are fever, altered bowel habits, loss of weight and a feeling of lump in the abdomen. Night sweats, nausea, loss of appetite, constipation, diarrhoea, blood in stool and perforation of bowel are some of the rare symptoms of abdominal tuberculosis. The most common site of affection of tuberculosis in case of intestinal involvement is ileocecal junction.

== Mechanism ==
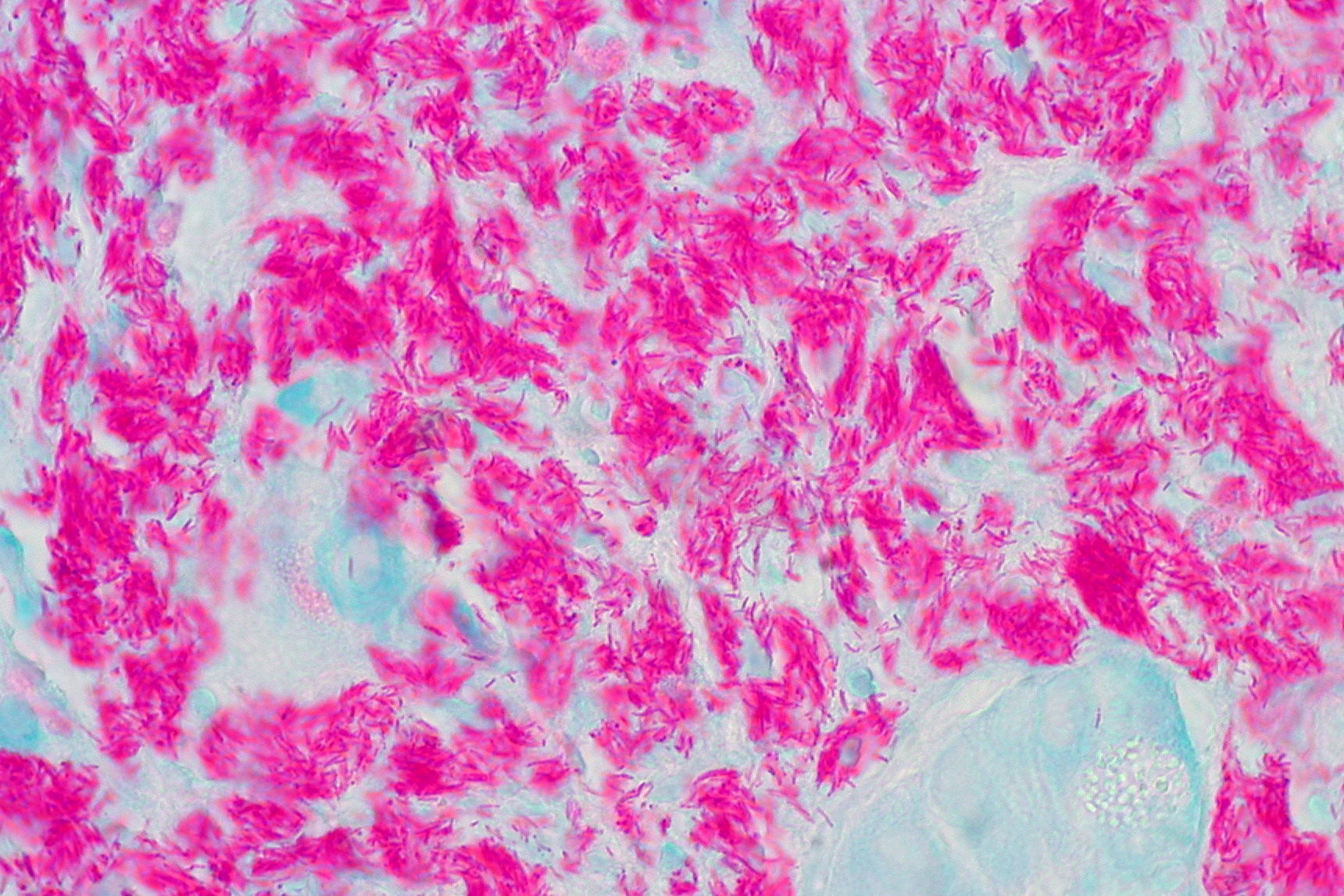
Histopathology of tuberculosis of the duodenum. Numerous rod shaped tuberculosis bacilli can be seen.

There are several ways by which tuberculosis can infect the abdomen. The tubercle bacteria many enter the abdomen via the consumption of infected milk. Those with existing pulmonary tuberculosis can have abdominal tuberculosis through the ingestion of infected sputum. When the gastrointestinal tract is infected with the bacteria, epitheloid tubercles are formed in the lymphoid tissue of the submucosal layer. Subsequently, caseous necrosis of the tubercles can occur, leading to ulceration of the mucosa. At this stage, the bacilli can spread to adjacent lymph nodes and deeper layers of the peritoneum. Tuberculosis can also spread through the blood from the primary focus to elsewhere in the abdomen. Abdominal solid organs, kidneys, lymph nodes and peritoneum can be affected this way. Tuberculosis is also reported to spread to the peritoneum directly from adjacently situated infected foci, such as from the fallopian tubes, adnexa, psoas abscess or secondary tuberculous spondylitis. It can also spread from infected lymph nodes via lymphatic channels.

== Diagnosis ==
The clinical presentation of abdominal tuberculosis is often atypical, tissue samples for confirmation of diagnosis can be difficult to procure and conventional diagnostic methods have poor yield. Therefore, the diagnosis is often delayed. The diagnosis is often suspected clinically with relevant manifestations or epidemiological factors such as known prior tuberculosis and possible TB exposure. A high index of suspicion of TB should be maintained in immunocompromised individuals. Those with extra-abdominal tuberculosis should undergo evaluation for abdominal involvement in case of clinical suspicion. The definitive diagnosis can be established by demonstrating Mycobacterium tuberculosis in peritoneal fluid or in a biopsy specimen. The histopathologic findings of tuberculosis in biopsy, such as caseous granuloma, can be suggestive of tuberculosis, but is not pathognomic. CT scan offers evaluation of involvement of the liver or other organs, as well as for the presence of ascites, lymphadenopathy and peritoneal involvement. Ultrasound scan is useful for demonstrating lymphadenopathy and ascites.

== Management ==
Abdominal tuberculosis most often responds to treatment with anti-tuberculosis drugs. Treatment using anti-tuberculous drugs can cause resolution in fever, ascites and bleeding in a few weeks after the start of the therapy.

=== Surgical management ===
Surgery may be warranted in abdominal tuberculosis in case of complications such as perforation, abscess, bleeding, fistula or obstruction. There are three types of surgeries usually performed in abdominal tuberculosis. The first type of surgery is to bypass the affected segments of the bowel. The second type is a more extensive surgery called hemicolectomy, where a large portion of the bowel is removed. The third type is stricturoplasty which is done for relieving the luminal obstruction caused due to intestinal tuberculosis. When bowel perforations occur in tuberculosis, it is usually treated by the resection of the involved segments.

== Epidemiology ==
Abdominal tuberculosis accounts for up to 5% of tuberculosis cases worldwide, out of which 1–3% is gastrointestinal tuberculosis. It makes up for less than 11–15% of all tuberculosis cases in immunocompetent individuals. Approximately 20% of individuals with abdominal tuberculosis have active tuberculosis. The incidence of abdominal tuberculosis has increased in the last few decades due to the increased incidence of HIV infection, which makes individuals vulnerable to tuberculosis.
