= Omentum =

In human anatomy, omentum (Latin for 'apron') refers to a fold of the peritoneum, a thin membrane lining the abdominal cavity and the abdominal organs. The term may refer to two structures:

- Greater omentum
- Lesser omentum
