= Splenocolic ligament =

Peritoneal ligament connecting the splenic capsule to the transverse colon

Details

Identifiers
- Latin: ligamentum splenocolicum
- TA98: A10.1.02.210
- TA2: 3768
- FMA: 76985

The splenocolic ligament is a peritoneal ligament connecting the splenic capsule to the transverse colon. Made of visceral peritoneum, it lies between the greater omentum and the transverse mesocolon. It has three attached borders, superiorly to the spleen, inferiorly to splenic flexure of transverse colon and posteriorly to the pancreaticocolic ligament, which itself is attached posteriorly to the left kidney, and a free anterior one

Of clinical relevance, one cause of exercise-induced pain in one's left side (a side stitch) is stretching of this ligament and the peritoneum when the spleen swells from exertion.
