= Duodenorenal ligament =

Ligament of the duodenum and kidney

Details
- From: Duodenum
- To: kidney

Identifiers
- Latin: ligamentum duodenorenale

The duodenorenal ligament is a fold of peritoneum that occasionally crosses from the duodenum at the termination of the hepatoduodenal ligament to the right kidney. The duodenorenal ligament is an anatomic variation of the peritoneum, and is not commonly present.

It is one of many factors that may hold the kidney in place when standing. It was believed, at least in the 1920s, that tension in this ligament might explain how renal diseases can cause gastrointestinal symptoms.
