= Pararectal fossa =

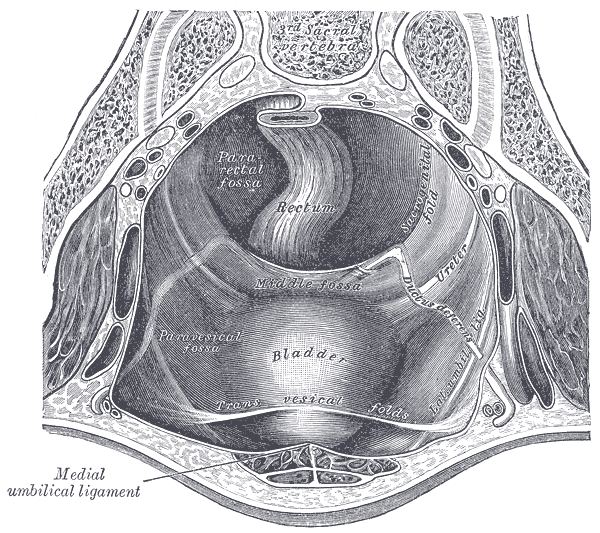
- The peritoneum of the male pelvis. (Pararectal fossa visible at center left.)

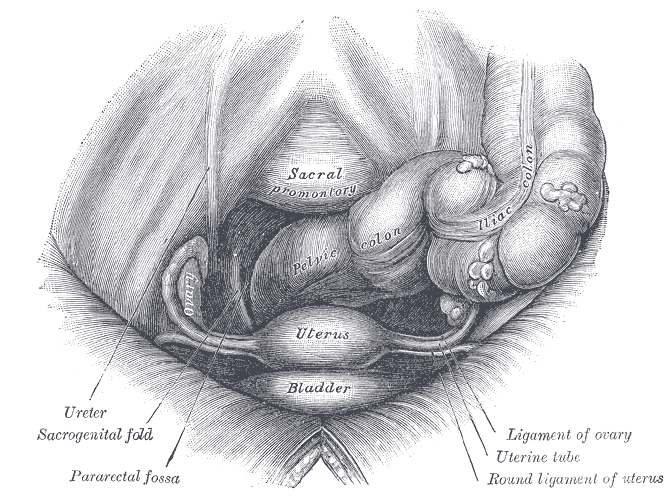
- Female pelvis and its contents, seen from above and in front. (Pararectal fossa labeled at bottom left.)

Details

Identifiers
- Latin: fossa pararectalis
- TA98: A10.1.02.514
- TA2: 3728
- FMA: 19749

The pararectal fossa (or pararectal pouch) is an inferior-ward extension of the peritoneum on either side of the rectum. It is formed by a (sacrogenital) fold of peritoneum extending inferiorly (downwards) from the posterolateral pelvic wall. It represents a lateral extension of the rectouterine pouch in the female, and of rectovesical pouch in the male. It varies in size with the distension of the rectum.

In females, the pararectal fossae often represent the inferior-most portion of the peritoneal cavity (sometimes, the inferior-most portion is instead rectouterine pouch).
