= Hepatocolic ligament =

Ligament of the liver and colon

Details
- From: liver
- To: colon

Identifiers
- Latin: ligamentum hepatocolicum
- TA98: A10.1.02.106
- TA2: 3755
- FMA: 16553

The hepatocolic ligament is an occasional fold of peritoneum that extends from the right side of the lesser omentum and passes from the lower surface of the liver near the gallbladder to the hepatic flexure.
