= Omental infarction =

Interruption in blood supply to the greater omentum

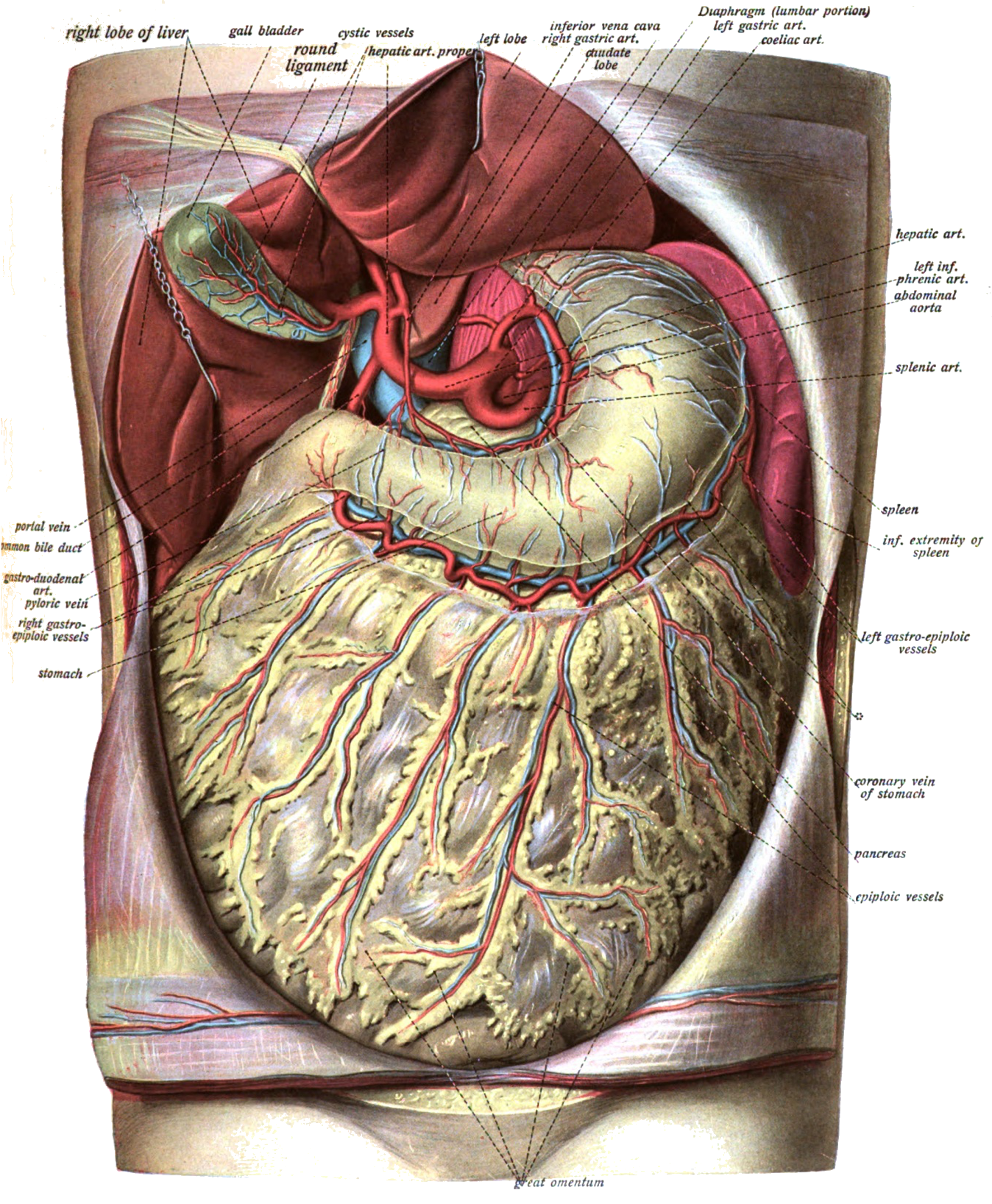
- Greater omentum covers the intestines.
- Specialty: Gastroenterology
- Symptoms: acute colicky abdominal pain, vomiting
- Complications: omental torsion
- Usual onset: acute
- Types: primary and secondary
- Causes: redundant omental veins
- Risk factors: polycythemia, hypercoagulopathy, vasculitidis,
- Diagnostic method: omental torsion
- Differential diagnosis: acute appendicitis, acute diverticulitis, mesenteric lymphadenitis, panniculitis, acute cholecystitis
- Treatment: conservative/surgical
- Medication: analgesics, antibiotics
- Prognosis: good
- Frequency: rare
- Deaths: very rare

Omental infarction, or omental torsion, is an acute vascular disorder which compromises tissue of the greater omentum—the largest peritoneal fold in the abdomen.

== Signs and symptoms ==
Patients will present with a sudden onset of cramps/abdominal pain or a 'stitch'. The pain localises in the area of the umbilicus and can radiate to the lumbar and surrounding regions.

== Causes ==
Omental infarction is a rare cause of acute abdomen pain with reported incidence being less than 4 per 1000 cases of appendicitis. Omental infarction usually presents as right-sided abdominal pain although seldom causing left-sided abdominal pain and even epigastric pain. The dominion of right-sided abdominal pain in omental infarction has been attributed to right segmental infarction as a result of the tenuous blood vessels in this part of the omentum as well as its longer size and higher mobility in comparison to the left side which subjects it to torsion. Obesity is a known risk factor for omental infarction. The theory behind this is that fat accumulation within the omentum occludes blood supply to the distal parts of the omentum in addition to making it more susceptible to torsion. Other risk factors for omental infarction are polycythemia, hypercoagulability, and vasculitides plus other conditions which predispose to torsion such as trauma, sudden body movements, coughing, heavy food intake, and hyperperistalsis.

Historically, omental infarction was diagnosed only intraoperatively during surgery for presumed appendicitis or other causes of acute abdomen. But with the increase in the use of imaging, especially abdominal computed tomography (CT) scan in the work-up for acute abdomen, more cases of omental infarction are being diagnosed preoperatively. This has also led to the observation that omental infarction is a self-limiting condition which can be managed conservatively. Currently, conservative management and surgery are the only treatment options for omental infarction with no consensus as to the best treatment modality. Having both acute appendicitis and omental infarction is extremely rare with only three cases reported in the literature.

== Diagnosis ==
The diagnosis is usually inferred from abdominal CT scan which shows a localised inflammatory-appearing mass of omentum .

== Treatment ==
Conservative treatment may include antibiotics, anti-inflammatory medication, and pain medication.

== See also ==
- Greater omentum
