= Hepatorenal ligament =

Ligament of the liver and kidney

Details
- From: Liver
- To: Kidney

Identifiers
- Latin: ligamentum hepatorenale
- TA98: A10.1.02.306
- TA2: 3777
- FMA: 16519

The hepatorenal ligament is the fold of peritoneum that extends from the lower posterior surface of the liver to the anterior surface of the right kidney. It forms the right margin of the lesser sac.

== Structure ==
The hepatorenal ligament extends from the lower posterior surface of the liver to the anterior surface of the right kidney. It forms the right margin of the lesser sac.

== History ==
The term "hepatorenal ligament" is sometimes considered a synonym for the coronary ligament, and sometimes considered a component of it.
