= Friedrich Hensing =

German professor

Friedrich Wilhelm Hensing
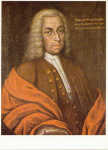
- Born: 17 April 1719; Giessen, Germany
- Died: 9 November 1745 (aged 26); Giessen, Germany
- Known for: The phrenicocolic ligament is called Hensing's ligament after his death.
- Scientific career
- Fields: Medicine ،Anatomy
- Institutions: University of Giessen

Friedrich Wilhelm Hensing (17 April 1719 – 9 November 1745), born in Giessen, was a German professor of medicine and anatomy at the University of Giessen.

The phrenicocolic ligament is called Hensing's ligament after him.

== Life ==
Hensing was a son of John Thomas Hensing, and his wife is Maria Juliana, the daughter of Friedrich Nitsch, the Hessian Court Assessors at the Law Faculty and Vice-Chancellor of University of Giessen.

== Publications ==
- Dissertatio Inauguralis De Peritonaeo. Lammers, 1742.
- Denkmahl der Liebe. Hammer, 1744, 4 Seiten
