= Triangular ligament =

Triangular ligament may refer to:

- Left triangular ligament of the liver (ligamentum triangulare sinistrum hepatis)
- Right triangular ligament of the liver (ligamentum triangulare dextrum hepatis)
- Urogenital diaphragm (Diaphragma urogenitale), a layer of the pelvis
