= Peritoneal cavity =

Empty space between parietal and visceral layers of peritoneum

Details
- Precursor: Intraembryonic coelom

Identifiers
- Latin: cavitas peritonealis, saccus serosus peritonei
- MeSH: D010529
- TA98: A10.1.02.001
- TA2: 3702
- TH: H3.04.08.0.00011
- FMA: 14704

The peritoneal cavity is a potential space located between the two layers of the peritoneum—the parietal peritoneum, the serous membrane that lines the abdominal wall, and visceral peritoneum, which surrounds the internal organs. While situated within the abdominal cavity, the term peritoneal cavity specifically refers to the potential space enclosed by these peritoneal membranes. The cavity contains a thin layer of lubricating serous fluid that enables the organs to move smoothly against each other, facilitating the movement and expansion of internal organs during digestion.

The parietal and visceral peritonea are named according to their location and function. The peritoneal cavity, derived from the coelomic cavity in the embryo, is one of several body cavities, including the pleural cavities surrounding the lungs and the pericardial cavity around the heart.

The peritoneal cavity is the largest serosal sac and fluid-filled cavity in the body, it secretes approximately 50 milliliters (1.7 U.S. fl oz) of fluid daily. This fluid serves as a lubricant and has anti-inflammatory properties. The cavity is divided into the greater and lesser sacs, with the greater sac further subdivided into the supracolic and infracolic compartments.

== Compartments ==
The peritoneal cavity is divided into the greater and lesser sacs. The greater sac comprises the majority of the peritoneal cavity, while the lesser sac, also known as the omental bursa, is smaller and situated posterior to the stomach and lesser omentum. They are connected by the omental foramen.

The greater sac is further subdivided into two compartments by the mesentery of the transverse colon, known as the transverse mesocolon. This division creates an upper and a lower compartment within the greater sac, named the supracolic and infracolic compartment respectively, each housing different organs and structures of the abdominal cavity.

The liver, spleen, stomach, and lesser omentum are contained within the supracolic compartment. The small intestine surrounded by the ascending, transverse, and descending colon, and the paracolic gutters are contained within the infracolic compartment.

== Clinical significance ==
The peritoneal cavity is widely used in intraperitoneal injections to administer chemotherapy drugs, and is also utilized in peritoneal dialysis. An increase in capillary pressure in the abdominal organs can cause fluid to leave the interstitial space and enter the peritoneal cavity, resulting in a condition called ascites. When cerebrospinal fluid overaccumulates, such as in hydrocephalus, the fluid is commonly diverted intentionally to the peritoneal cavity using a surgically placed cerebral shunt. Sampling of body fluid from the peritoneal cavity is referred to as peritoneocentesis.

== See also ==
- Lesser sac
- Greater sac
