= Hepatophrenic ligament =

Ligament of the liver and diaphragm

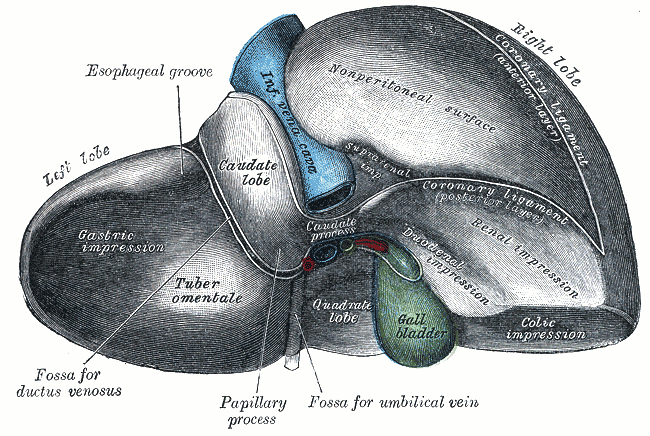
- Posterior and inferior surfaces of the liver.
- From: liver
- To: diaphragm

Identifiers
- TA98: A10.1.02.102
- TA2: 3751
- FMA: 76977

The hepatophrenic ligament is the superior-most portion of the lesser omentum that extends between the liver, and the diaphragm and (abdominal portion of) esophagus. It is situated superior to the hepatoesophageal ligament.
