= Gastrophrenic ligament =

Ligament of the stomach and diaphragm

Details

Identifiers
- Latin: ligamentum gastrophrenicum
- TA98: A10.1.02.202
- TA2: 3759
- FMA: 16518

The postero-superior surface of the stomach is covered by peritoneum, except over a small area close to the cardiac orifice; this area is limited by the lines of attachment of the gastrophrenic ligament, and lies in apposition with the diaphragm, and frequently with the upper portion of the left suprarenal gland. It is a subdivision of the greater omentum.
