= Hepatogastric ligament =

Ligament of the liver and stomach

- In this image, the hepatogastric ligament is labeled the lesser omentum, which it is part of. The hepatoduodenal ligament is a separate ligament that is also part of the lesser omentum.

Details
- From: Liver
- To: Stomach

Identifiers
- Latin: ligamentum hepatogastricum
- TA98: A10.1.02.104
- TA2: 3753
- FMA: 16520

The hepatogastric ligament or gastrohepatic ligament connects the liver to the lesser curvature of the stomach. It contains the right and the left gastric arteries. In the abdominal cavity, it separates the greater and lesser sacs on the right. It is sometimes cut during surgery in order to access the lesser sac. The hepatogastric ligament consists of a dense cranial portion and the caudal portion termed the pars flaccida.

== Additional images ==
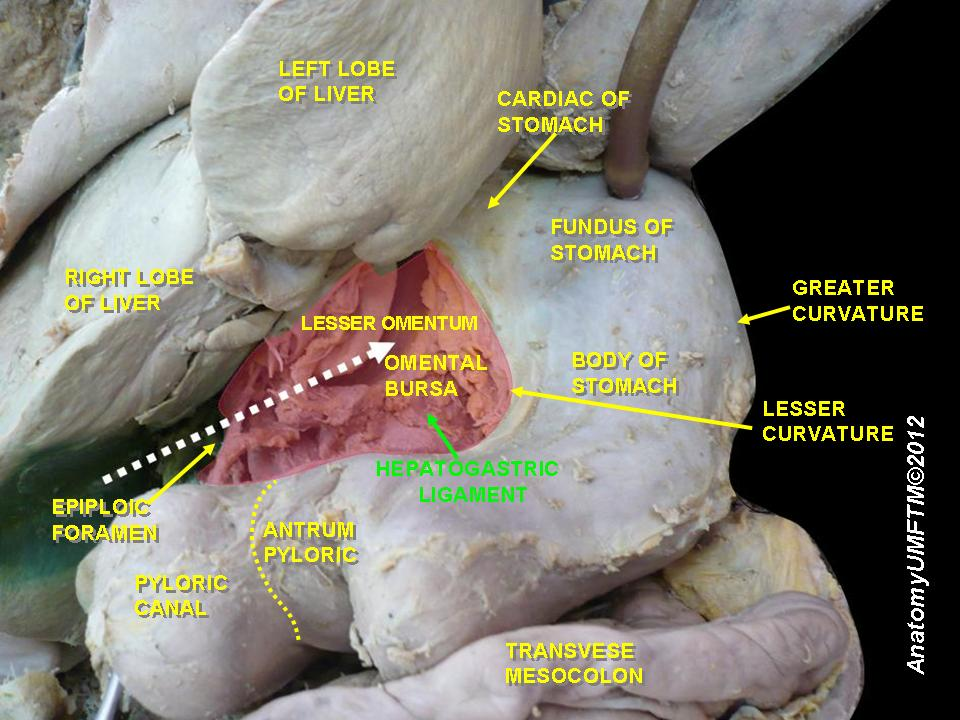
Hepatogastric ligament
