= Rectouterine fold =

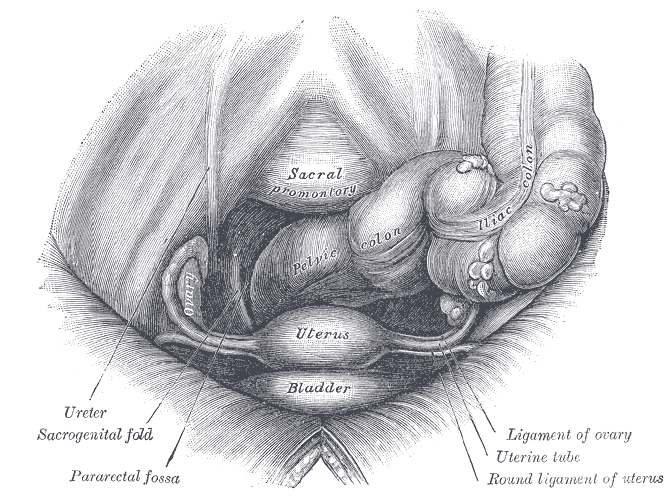
- Female pelvis and its contents, seen from above and in front. (Sacrogenital fold labeled at bottom left.)

Details

Identifiers
- Latin: plica rectouterina
- TA98: A10.1.02.511F
- TA2: 3806
- FMA: 16533

The rectouterine fold is a bilaterally paired prominent ridge/fold of the peritoneum that represents the lateral boundary of the rectouterine pouch on either side. It is formed by the underlying rectouterine muscle. On either side, the rectouterine fold extends between the sacrum medially, and the base of the broad ligament of the uterus laterally.
