= Omental foramen =

Part of the human abdomen

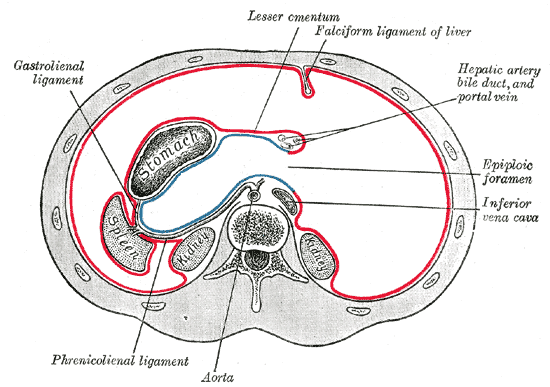
- Horizontal disposition of the peritoneum in the upper part of the abdomen.

- Entry to omental bursa (black arrow) by omental foramen (white mark)

Details

Identifiers
- Latin: foramen omentale
- TA98: A10.1.02.403
- TA2: 3704
- FMA: 14711

In human anatomy, the omental foramen (epiploic foramen, foramen of Winslow after the anatomist Jacob B. Winslow, or uncommonly aditus; Latin: Foramen epiploicum) is the passage of communication, or foramen, between the greater sac, and the lesser sac of the peritoneal cavity.

== Borders ==
It has the following borders:

- anterior: the free border of the lesser omentum, known as the hepatoduodenal ligament. This has two layers and within these layers are the common bile duct, hepatic artery, and hepatic portal vein.
- posterior: the peritoneum covering the inferior vena cava
- superior: the peritoneum covering the caudate lobe of the liver
- inferior: the peritoneum covering the commencement of the duodenum and the hepatic artery, the latter passing forward below the foramen before ascending between the two layers of the lesser omentum.
- left lateral: gastrosplenic ligament and splenorenal ligament

As the portal vein is the most posterior structure in the hepatoduodenal ligament, and the inferior vena cava lies under the posterior wall, the epiploic foramen can be remembered as lying between the two great veins of the abdomen.

== Additional images ==
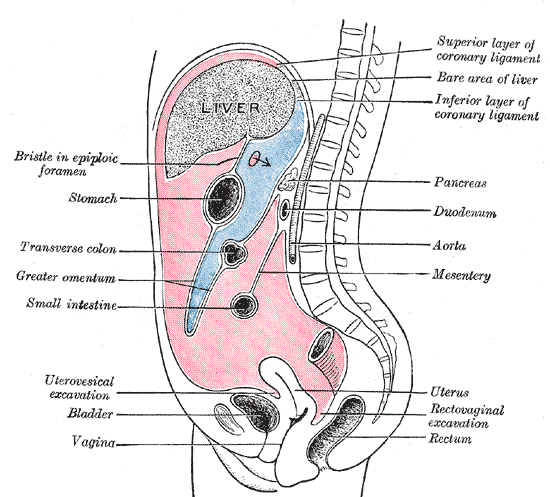
Vertical disposition of the peritoneum. Main cavity, red; omental bursa, blue. (Bristle in omental foramen labeled at upper left.)

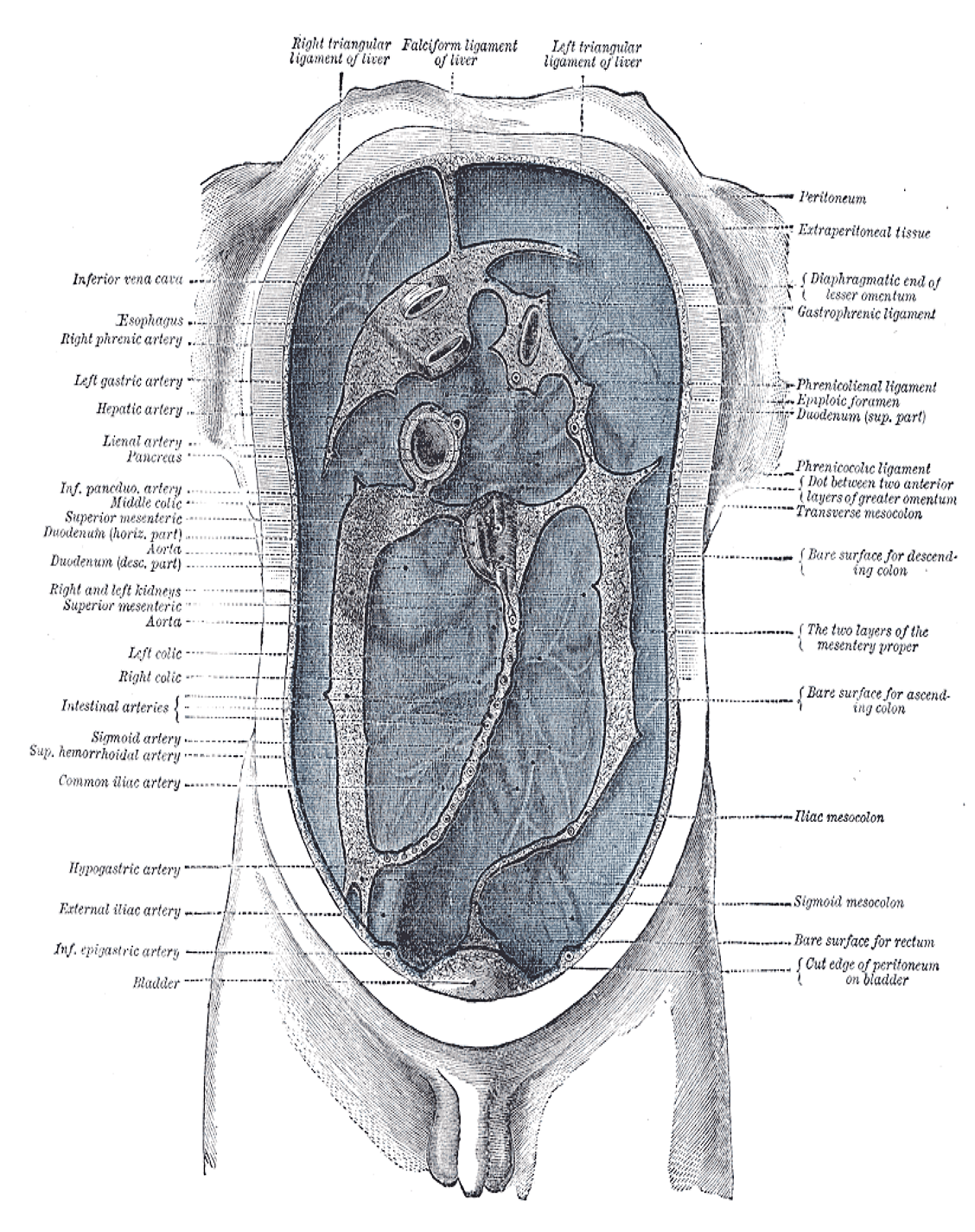
Diagram to show the lines along which the peritoneum leaves the wall of the abdomen to invest the viscera.

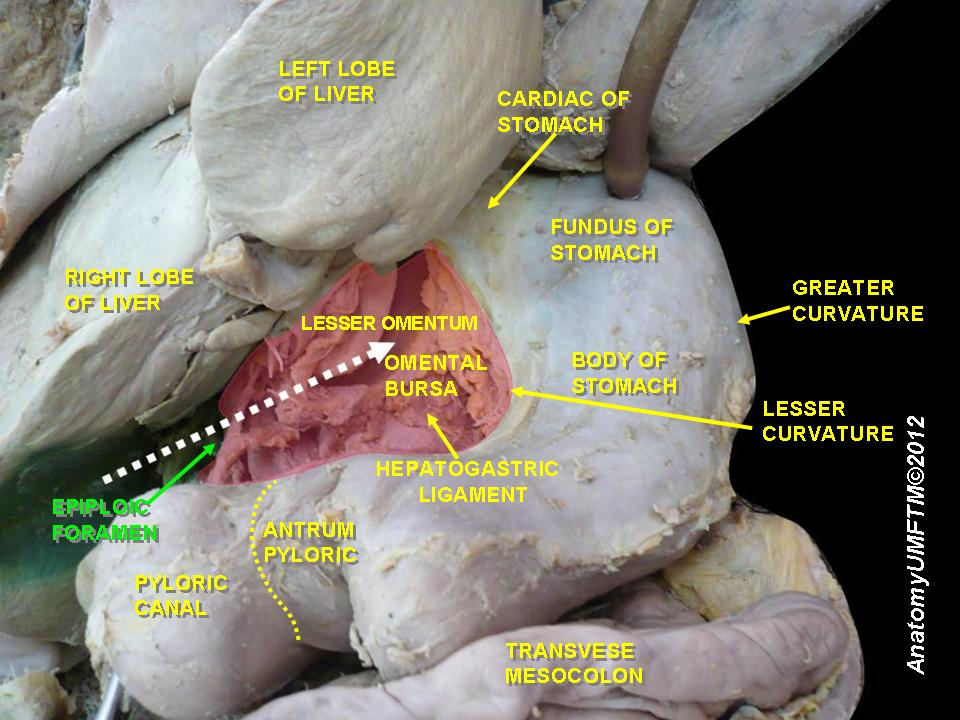
Epiploic foramen

== See also ==
- Terms for anatomical location
- Omental bursa (Lesser sac)
- Greater sac
- Lesser omentum
- Greater omentum
- Peritoneum
