= Lesser omentum =

Double layer of peritoneum in the abdomen

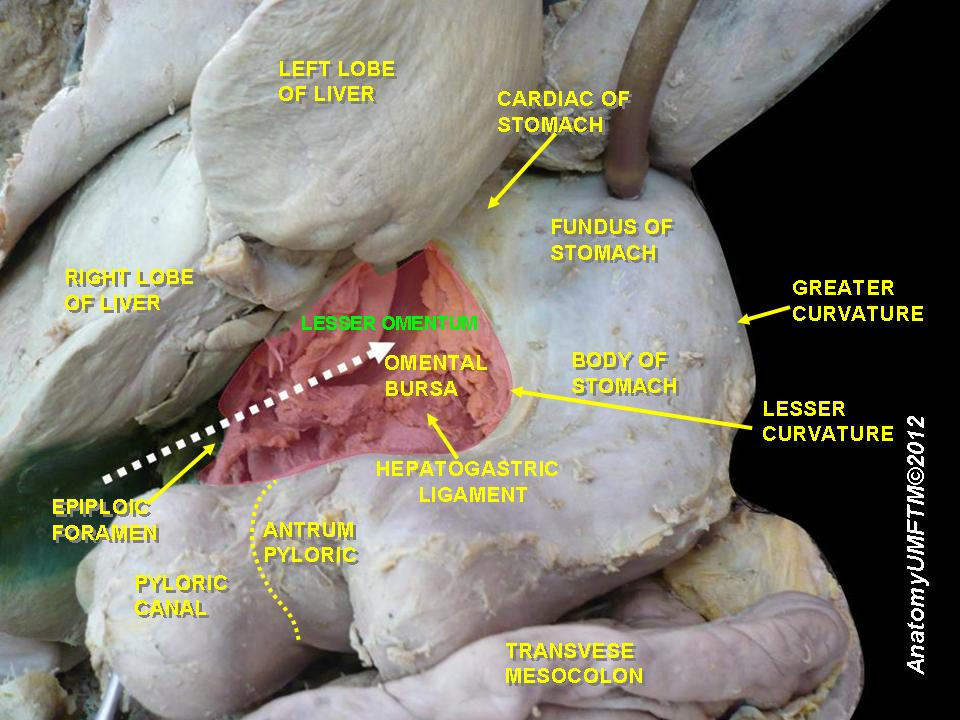
- The lesser omentum extends from the liver to the stomach and the duodenum

Details

Identifiers
- Latin: omentum minus
- TA98: A10.1.02.101
- TA2: 3750
- FMA: 9715

The lesser omentum (small omentum or gastrohepatic omentum) is the double layer of peritoneum that extends from the liver to the lesser curvature of the stomach, and to the first part of the duodenum. The lesser omentum is usually divided into these two connecting parts: the hepatogastric ligament, and the hepatoduodenal ligament.

== Structure ==
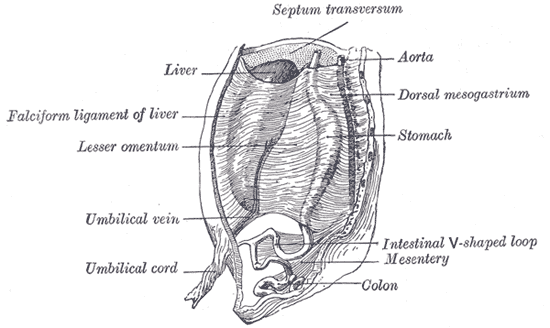
The primitive mesentery of a six weeks’ human embryo, half schematic. (Lesser omentum labeled at left.)

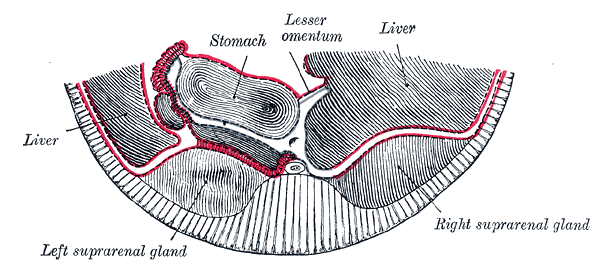
Schematic and enlarged cross-section through the body of a human embryo in the region of the mesogastrium, at end of third month

The lesser omentum is extremely thin, and is continuous with the two layers of peritoneum which cover respectively the antero-superior and postero-inferior surfaces of the stomach and first part of the duodenum.

When these two layers reach the lesser curvature of the stomach and the upper border of the duodenum, they join and ascend as a double fold to the porta hepatis.

To the left of the porta, the fold is attached to the bottom of the fossa for the ductus venosus, along which it is carried to the diaphragm, where the two layers separate to embrace the end of the esophagus.

At the right border of the lesser omentum, the two layers are continuous, and form a free margin which constitutes the anterior boundary of the omental foramen.

== Divisions ==
Anatomically, the lesser omentum is divided into ligaments, each starting with the prefix "hepato" to indicate that it connects to the liver at one end.

Most sources divide it into two parts:

- hepatogastric ligament: the portion connecting to the lesser curvature of the stomach
- hepatoduodenal ligament: the portion connecting to the duodenum

In some cases, the following ligaments are considered part of the lesser omentum:

- hepatophrenic ligament: the portion connecting to the thoracic diaphragm
- hepatoesophageal ligament: the portion connecting to the esophagus
- hepatocolic ligament: the portion connecting to the colon

== Contents ==
Between the two layers of the lesser omentum, close to the right free margin, are the hepatic artery proper, the common bile duct, the portal vein, lymphatics, and the hepatic plexus of nerves—all these structures being enclosed in a fibrous capsule (Glisson's capsule).

Between the layers of the lesser omentum, where they are attached to the stomach, run the right and left gastric arteries, as well as the gastric veins.

== Additional images ==
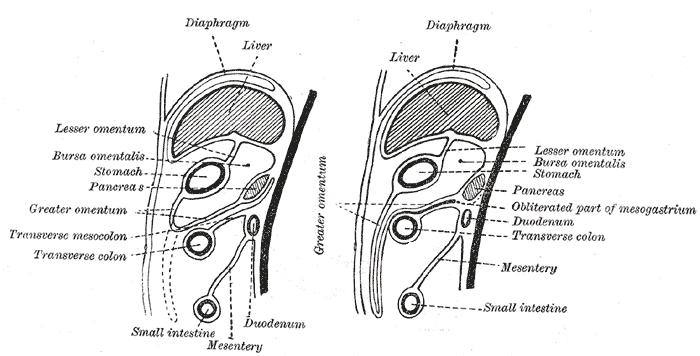
Diagrams to illustrate the development of the greater omentum and transverse mesocolon.

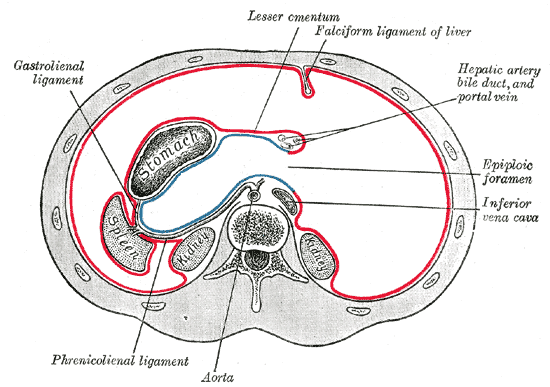
Horizontal disposition of the peritoneum in the upper part of the abdomen.

== See also ==
- Omental bursa (Lesser sac)
- Greater sac
- Omental foramen (Epiploic foramen, Foramen of Winslow)
- Greater omentum – Fat sheath under abdominal wall
- Peritoneum – Membrane that forms lining of abdominal cavity or coelom
