= Left triangular ligament =

Ligament of the liver and diaphragm

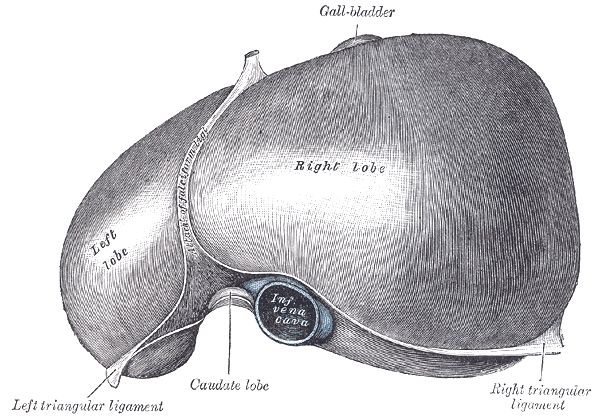
- The superior surface of the liver.

Details

Identifiers
- Latin: ligamentum triangulare sinistrum hepatis
- TA98: A10.1.02.305
- TA2: 3776
- FMA: 76987

The left triangular ligament is a large peritoneal fold. It connects the posterior part of the upper surface of the left lobe of the liver to the thoracic diaphragm.

== Structure ==
The left triangular ligament connects the posterior part of the upper surface of the left lobe of the liver to the thoracic diaphragm. Its anterior layer is continuous with the left layer of the falciform ligament.

== Additional images ==
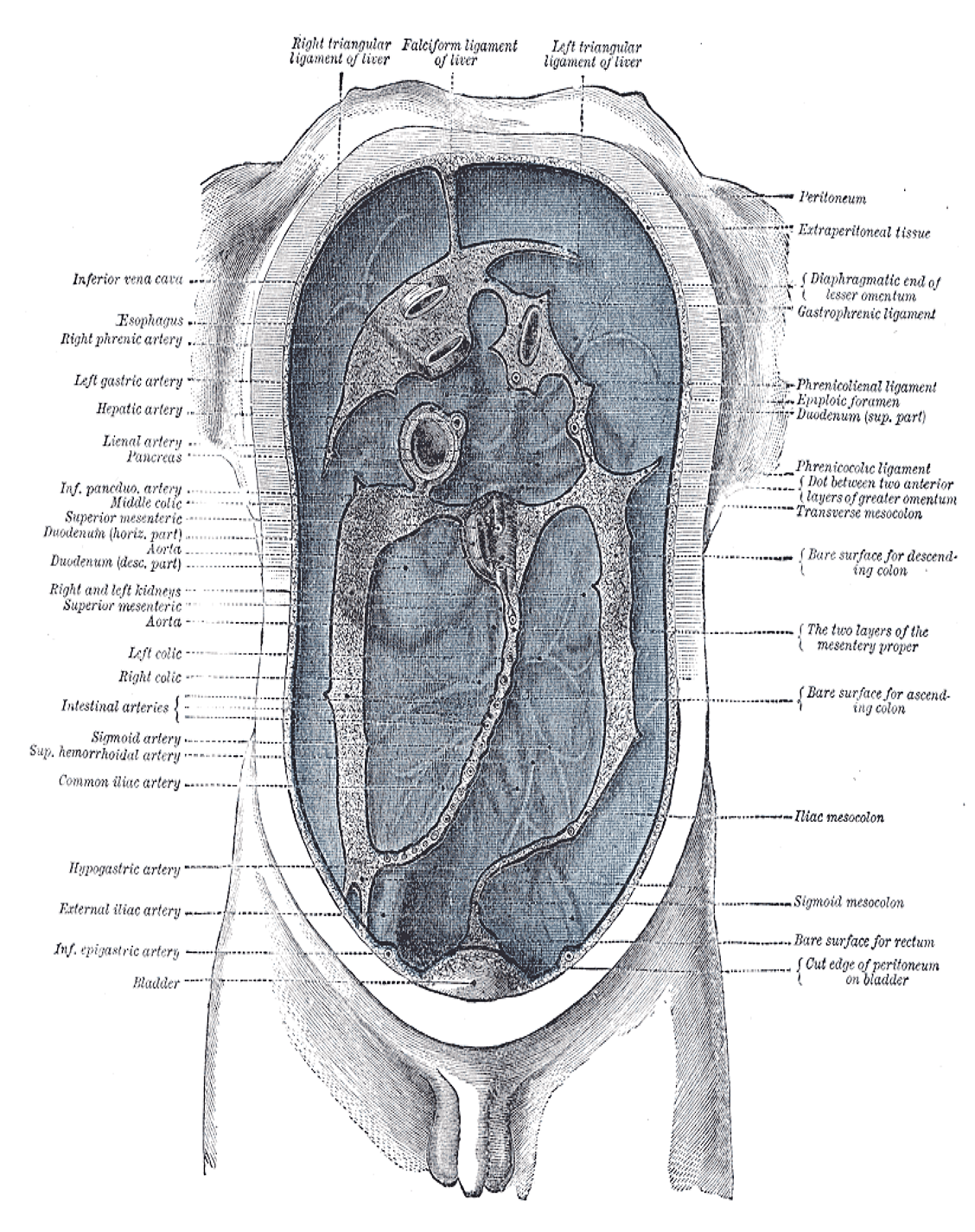
Diagram to show the lines along which the peritoneum leaves the wall of the abdomen to invest the viscera.

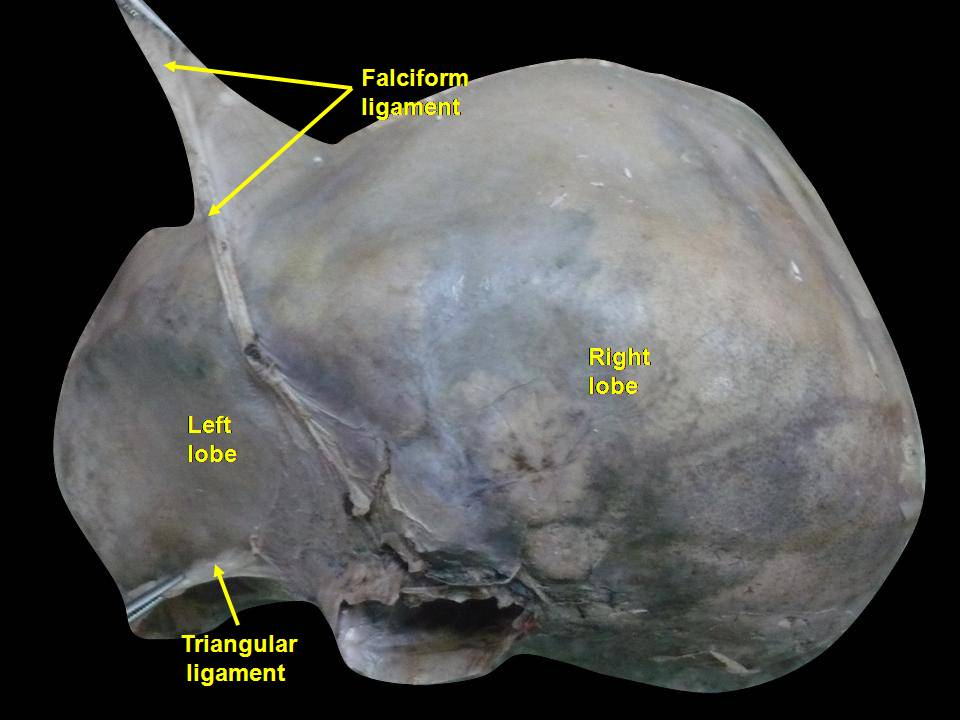
Triangular ligament of liver.Superior surface of liver.

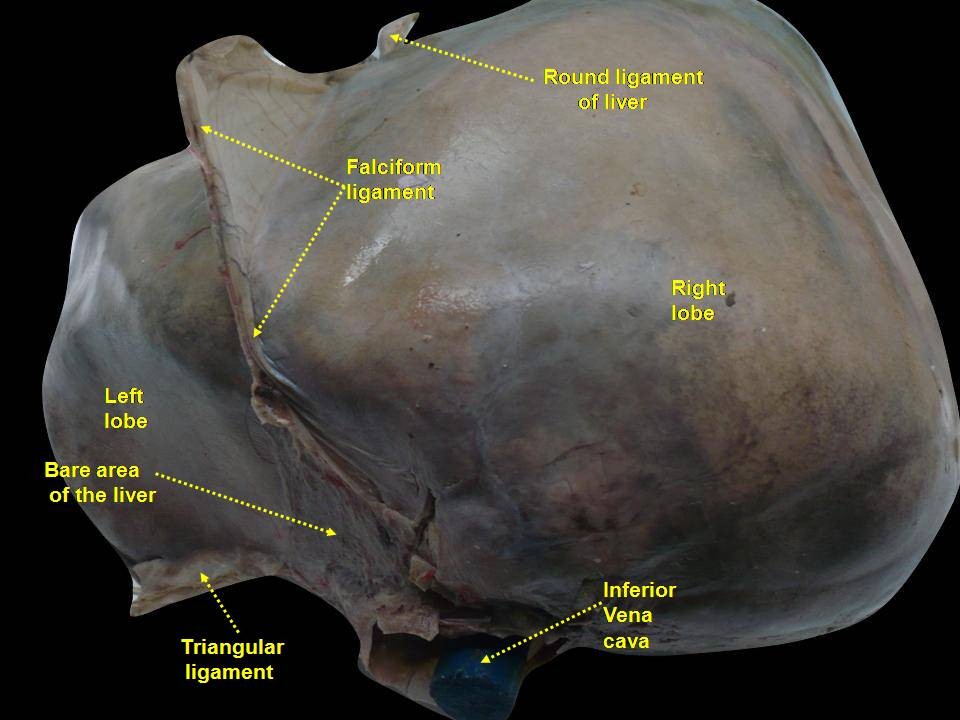
Triangular ligament.Diaphragmatic surface of liver.
