= Greater sac =

Cavity in the abdomen

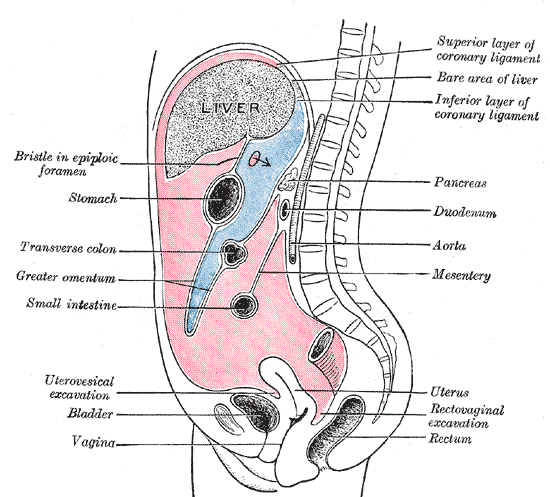
- The greater sac or general cavity (red) and lesser sac, or omental bursa (blue).

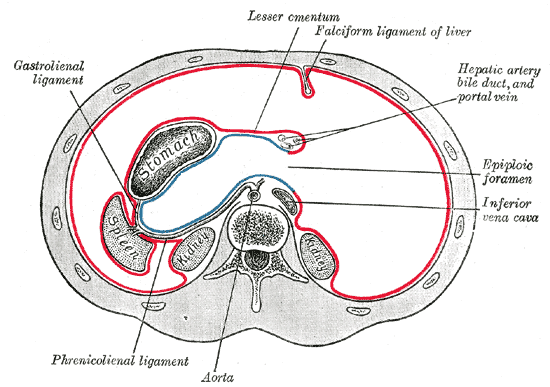
- Horizontal disposition of the peritoneum in the upper part of the abdomen.

In human anatomy, the greater sac, also known as the general cavity (of the abdomen) or peritoneum of the peritoneal cavity proper, is the cavity in the abdomen that is inside the peritoneum but outside the lesser sac.

A description of the greater sac in three dimensions.

It is connected with the lesser sac via the omental foramen, also known as the foramen of Winslow or epiploic foramen, which is anteriorly bounded by the portal triad – portal vein, hepatic artery, and common bile duct.

== Additional images ==
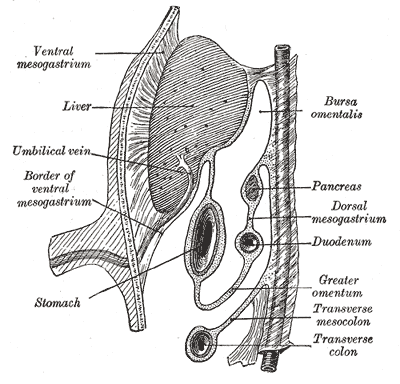
Schematic figure of the bursa omentalis, etc. Human embryo of eight weeks.

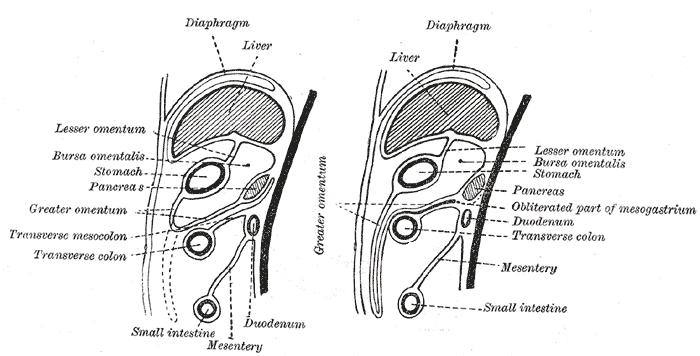
Diagrams to illustrate the development of the greater omentum and transverse mesocolon.

== See also ==
- Coelom
- Greater omentum
- Lesser omentum
- Omental bursa (Lesser sac)
- Omental foramen (Epiploic foramen, Foramen of Winslow)
- Peritoneum
