= Hepatoduodenal ligament =

Ligament of the liver and duodenum

- Ligament with its contents partially exposed

Details

Identifiers
- Latin: ligamentum hepatoduodenale
- TA98: A10.1.02.105
- TA2: 3754
- FMA: 16521

The hepatoduodenal ligament is the portion of the lesser omentum extending between the porta hepatis of the liver and the superior part of the duodenum.

Running inside it are the following structures collectively known as the portal triad:

- hepatic artery proper
- portal vein
- common bile duct

Manual compression of the hepatoduodenal ligament during surgery is known as the Pringle manoeuvre.

The cystoduodenal ligament is also found in the lesser omentum and is distinct from both the hepatoduodenal and hepatogastric ligaments. The cystoduodenal ligament is an abnormal peritoneal fold that attaches the duodenum to the gallbladder, representing a rare variation in the anatomy of the lesser sac and its foramen.

Another variation sometimes present at the duodenal termination of the hepatoduodenal ligament is the duodenorenal ligament which passes to the front of the right kidney.
