= Gastrocolic ligament =

Ligament of the stomach and colon

- The gastrocolic ligament and its relationships

Details

Identifiers
- Latin: ligamentum gastrocolicum
- TA98: A10.1.02.205
- TA2: 3762
- FMA: 16552

The gastrocolic ligament is a subdivision of the greater omentum that stretches from the greater curvature of the stomach to the transverse colon. It forms part of the anterior wall of the lesser sac.

Dividing the gastrocolic ligament provides access to the anterior pancreas and the posterior wall of the stomach. This is commonly done for Whipple procedures, distal pancreatectomy, some forms of the Roux-en-Y gastric bypass, and exploratory laparotomy.
