= Peritoneum =

Membrane that forms lining of abdominal cavity or coelom

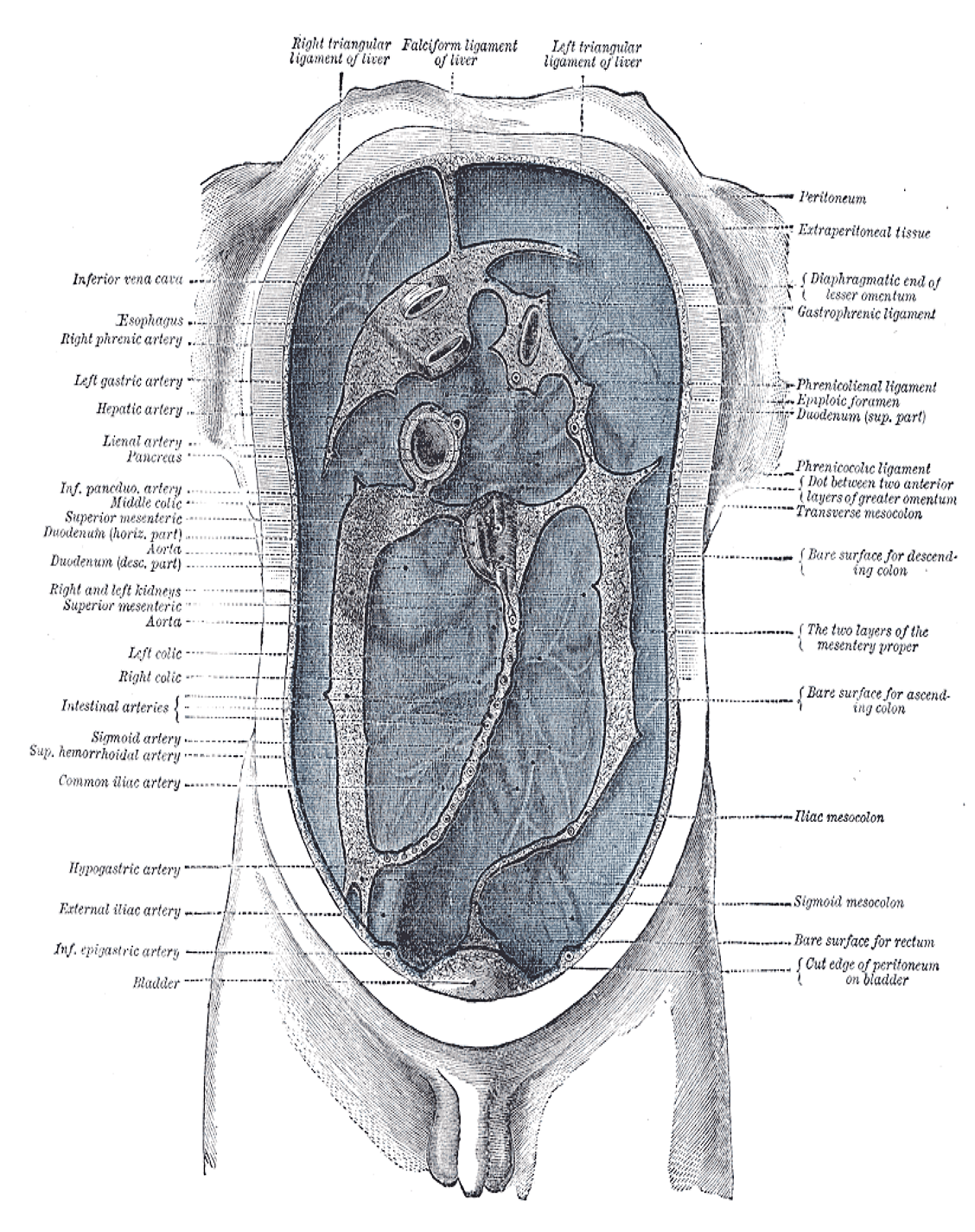
- The peritoneum, colored in blue

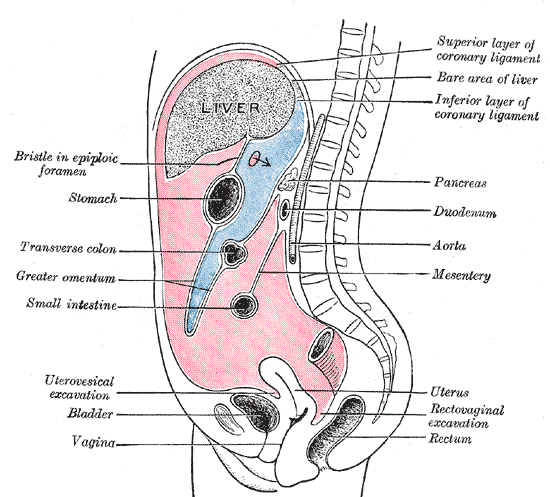
- The epiploic foramen, greater sac or general cavity (red) and lesser sac, or omental bursa (blue)

Details
- Pronunciation: /ˌpɛrɪtəˈniːəm/
- Part of: Abdomen

Identifiers
- Latin: peritoneum
- MeSH: D010537
- TA98: A10.1.02.002; A10.1.02.005; A10.1.02.006
- TA2: 3729
- TH: H3.04.08.0.00001
- FMA: 9584

The peritoneum is the serous membrane forming the lining of the abdominal cavity or coelom in amniotes and some invertebrates, such as annelids. It covers most of the intra-abdominal (or coelomic) organs, and is composed of a layer of mesothelium supported by a thin layer of connective tissue. This peritoneal lining of the cavity supports many of the abdominal organs and serves as a conduit for their blood vessels, lymphatic vessels, and nerves.

The abdominal cavity (the space bounded by the vertebrae, abdominal muscles, diaphragm, and pelvic floor) is different from the intraperitoneal space (located within the abdominal cavity but wrapped in peritoneum). The structures within the intraperitoneal space are called "intraperitoneal" (e.g., the stomach and intestines), the structures in the abdominal cavity that are located behind the intraperitoneal space are called "retroperitoneal" (e.g., the kidneys), and those structures below the intraperitoneal space are called "subperitoneal" or "infraperitoneal" (e.g., the bladder).

== Structure ==
=== Layers ===
The peritoneum is one continuous sheet, forming two layers and a potential space between them: the peritoneal cavity.

The outer layer, the parietal peritoneum, is attached to the abdominal wall and the pelvic walls. The tunica vaginalis, the serous membrane covering the male testis, is derived from the vaginal process, an outpouching of the parietal peritoneum.

The inner layer, the visceral peritoneum, is wrapped around the visceral organs, located inside the intraperitoneal space for protection. It is thinner than the parietal peritoneum. The mesentery is a double layer of visceral peritoneum that attaches to the gastrointestinal tract. There are often blood vessels, nerves, and other structures between these layers. The space between these two layers is technically outside of the peritoneal sac, and thus not in the peritoneal cavity.

The potential space between the parietal and visceral peritoneum is the peritoneal cavity, filled with a small amount (about 50 mL) of slippery serous fluid that allows the two layers to slide freely over each other.

The right paracolic gutter is continuous with the right and left subhepatic spaces. The epiploic foramen allows communication between the greater sac and the lesser sac. The peritoneal space in males is closed, while the peritoneal space in females is continuous with the extraperitoneal pelvis through openings of the fallopian tubes, the uterus, and the vagina.

=== Subdivisions ===
Peritoneal folds are omentums, mesenteries and ligaments; they connect organs to each other or to the abdominal wall. There are two main regions of the peritoneal cavity, connected by the omental foramen.

- The greater sac, represented in red in the diagrams above.
- The lesser sac, represented in blue. The lesser sac is divided into two "omenta":
  - The lesser omentum (or hepatogastric) is attached to the lesser curvature of the stomach and the liver.
  - The greater omentum (or gastrocolic) hangs from the greater curvature of the stomach and loops down in front of the intestines before curving back upwards to attach to the transverse colon. In effect it is draped in front of the intestines like an apron and may serve as an insulating or protective layer.

The mesentery is the part of the peritoneum through which most abdominal organs are attached to the abdominal wall and supplied with blood and lymph vessels and nerves.

==== Omenta ====
Sources	Structure	From	To	Contains
Dorsal mesentery	Greater omentum	Greater curvature of stomach (and spleen)	Transverse colon	right and left gastroepiploic vessels and fat
	Gastrosplenic ligament	Stomach	Spleen	Short gastric artery, Left gastroepiploic artery
	Gastrophrenic ligament	Stomach	Diaphragm	Left inferior phrenic artery
	Gastrocolic ligament	Stomach	Transverse colon	Right gastroepiploic artery
	Splenorenal ligament	Spleen	Kidney	Splenic artery, Tail of pancreas
Ventral mesentery	Lesser omentum	Lesser curvature of the stomach (and duodenum)	Liver	The right free margin-hepatic artery, portal vein, and bile duct, lymph nodes and the lymph vessels, hepatic plexus of nerve, all enclosed in perivascular fibrous sheath. Along the lesser curvature of the stomach-left and right gastric artery, gastric group of lymph nodes and lyphatics, branches from gastric nerve.
	Hepatogastric ligament	Stomach	Liver	Right and left gastric artery
	Hepatoduodenal ligament	Duodenum	Liver	Hepatic artery proper, hepatic portal vein, bile duct, autonomic nerves

==== Mesenteries ====
Sources	Structure	From	To	Contains
Dorsal mesentery	Mesentery proper	Small intestine (jejunum and ileum)	Posterior abdominal wall	Superior mesenteric artery, accompanying veins, autonomic nerve plexuses, lymphatics, 100–200 lymph nodes and connective tissue with fat
	Transverse mesocolon	Transverse colon	Posterior abdominal wall	Middle colic
	Sigmoid mesocolon	Sigmoid colon	Pelvic wall	Sigmoid arteries and superior rectal artery
	Mesoappendix	Mesentery of ileum	Appendix	Appendicular artery

==== Other ligaments and folds ====
Sources	Structure	From	To	Contains
Ventral mesentery	Falciform ligament	Liver	Thoracic diaphragm, anterior abdominal wall	Round ligament of liver, paraumbilical vein
Left umbilical vein	Round ligament of liver	Liver	Umbilicus	
Ventral mesentery	Coronary ligament	Liver	Thoracic diaphragm	
Ductus venosus	Ligamentum venosum	Liver	Liver	
	Phrenicocolic ligament	Left colic flexure	Thoracic diaphragm	
Ventral mesentery	Left triangular ligament, right triangular ligament	Liver		
	Umbilical folds	Urinary bladder		
	Ileocecal fold	Ileum	Cecum	
	Broad ligament of the uterus	Uterus	Pelvic wall	Mesovarium, mesosalpinx, mesometrium
	Round ligament of uterus	Uterus	Inguinal canal	
	Suspensory ligament of the ovary	Ovary	Pelvic wall	Ovarian artery

In addition, in the pelvic cavity there are several structures that are usually named not for the peritoneum, but for the areas defined by the peritoneal folds:

Name	Location	Sexes possessing structure
Rectovesical pouch	Between rectum and urinary bladder	Male only
Rectouterine pouch	Between rectum and uterus	Female only
Vesicouterine pouch	Between urinary bladder and uterus	Female only
Pararectal fossa	Surrounding rectum	Male and female
Paravesical fossa	Surrounding urinary bladder	Male and female

=== Classification of abdominal and pelvic structures ===
The structures in the abdomen are classified as intraperitoneal, mesoperitoneal, retroperitoneal or infraperitoneal depending on whether they are covered with visceral peritoneum and whether they are attached by mesenteries (mensentery, mesocolon).

Intraperitoneal	Mesoperitoneal	Retroperitoneal ( or Extraperitoneal )	Infraperitoneal / Subperitoneal
Stomach, half of the first part of the duodenum [2.2 cm], jejunum, ileum, cecum, appendix, transverse colon, sigmoid colon, rectum (upper 1/3)		The rest of the duodenum, ascending colon, descending colon, rectum (middle 1/3)	Rectum (lower 1/3)
Spleen, pancreas (only tail)	Liver	Pancreas (except tail)	
		Kidneys, adrenal glands, proximal ureters, renal vessels	Urinary bladder, distal ureters
Ovaries, uterine fundus and body (surrounded by the broad ligament)			Gonadal blood vessels, uterine cervix, Fallopian tubes
		Inferior vena cava, aorta	

Structures that are intraperitoneal are generally mobile, while those that are retroperitoneal are relatively fixed in their location.

Some structures, such as the kidneys, are "primarily retroperitoneal", while others such as the majority of the duodenum, are "secondarily retroperitoneal", meaning that structure developed intraperitoneally but lost its mesentery and thus became retroperitoneal.

== Development ==
The peritoneum develops ultimately from the mesoderm of the trilaminar embryo. As the mesoderm differentiates, one region known as the lateral plate mesoderm splits to form two layers separated by an intraembryonic coelom. These two layers develop later into the visceral and parietal layers found in all serous cavities, including the peritoneum.

As an embryo develops, the various abdominal organs grow into the abdominal cavity from structures in the abdominal wall. In this process they become enveloped in a layer of peritoneum. The growing organs "take their blood vessels with them" from the abdominal wall, and these blood vessels become covered by peritoneum, forming a mesentery.

Peritoneal folds develop from the ventral and dorsal mesentery of the embryo.

== Clinical significance ==
=== Imaging assessment ===
CT scan is a fast (15 seconds) and efficient way in visualising the peritoneal spaces. Although ultrasound is good at visualizing peritoneal collections and ascites, without ionising radiation, it does not provide a good overall assessment of all the peritoneal cavities. MRI scan is also increasingly used to visualise peritoneal diseases, but requires long scan time (30 to 45 minutes) and prone to motion artifacts due to respiration and peristalsis and chemical shift artifacts at the bowel-mesentery interface. Those with peritoneal carcinomatosis, acute pancreatitis, and intraabdominal sepsis may not tolerate prolonged MRI scan.

=== Peritoneal dialysis ===
In one form of dialysis, called peritoneal dialysis, a glucose solution is sent through a tube into the peritoneal cavity. The fluid is left there for a prescribed amount of time to absorb waste products, and then removed through the tube. The reason for this effect is the high number of arteries and veins in the peritoneal cavity. Through the mechanism of diffusion, waste products are removed from the blood.

=== Peritonitis ===
Peritonitis is the inflammation of the peritoneum. It is more commonly associated to infection from a punctured organ of the abdominal cavity. It can also be provoked by the presence of fluids that produce chemical irritation, such as gastric acid or pancreatic juice. Peritonitis causes fever, tenderness, and pain in the abdominal area, which can be localized or diffuse. The treatment involves rehydration, administration of antibiotics, and surgical correction of the underlying cause. Mortality is higher in the elderly and if present for a prolonged time.

=== Primary peritoneal carcinoma ===
Primary peritoneal cancer is a cancer of the cells lining the peritoneum.

== Etymology ==
"Peritoneum" is derived from Greek: περιτόναιον, romanized: peritonaion, lit. 'peritoneum, abdominal membrane' via Latin. In Greek, περί, peri means "around", while τείνω, teino means "to stretch"; thus, "peritoneum" means "stretched over".

== Additional images ==
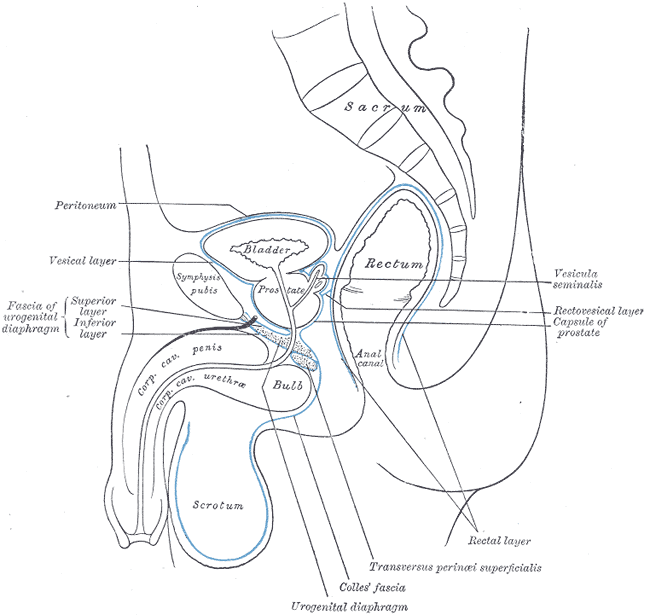
Median sagittal section of pelvis, showing the arrangement of fasciæ

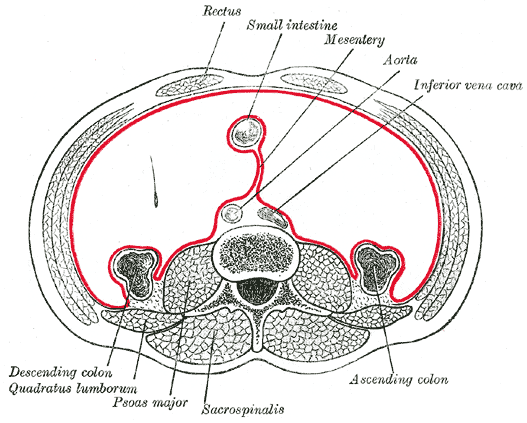
Horizontal disposition of the peritoneum in the lower part of the abdomen

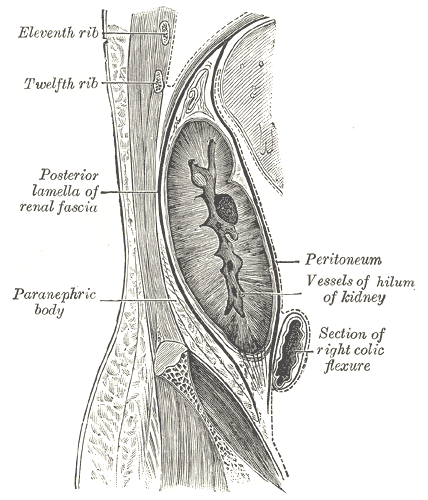
Sagittal section through posterior abdominal wall, showing the relations of the capsule of the kidney

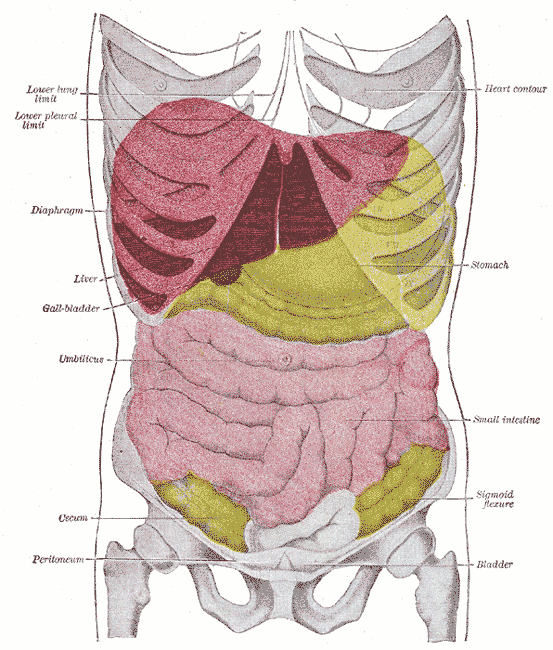
Topography of thoracic and abdominal viscera

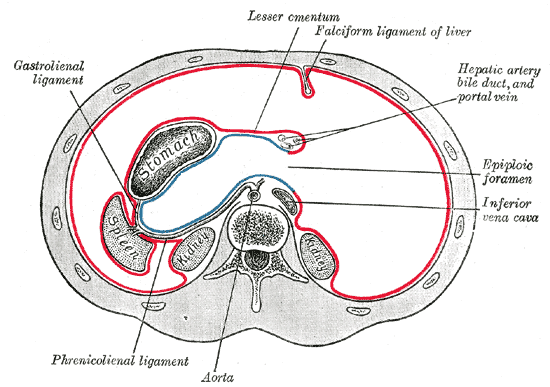
Horizontal disposition of the peritoneum in the upper part of the abdomen

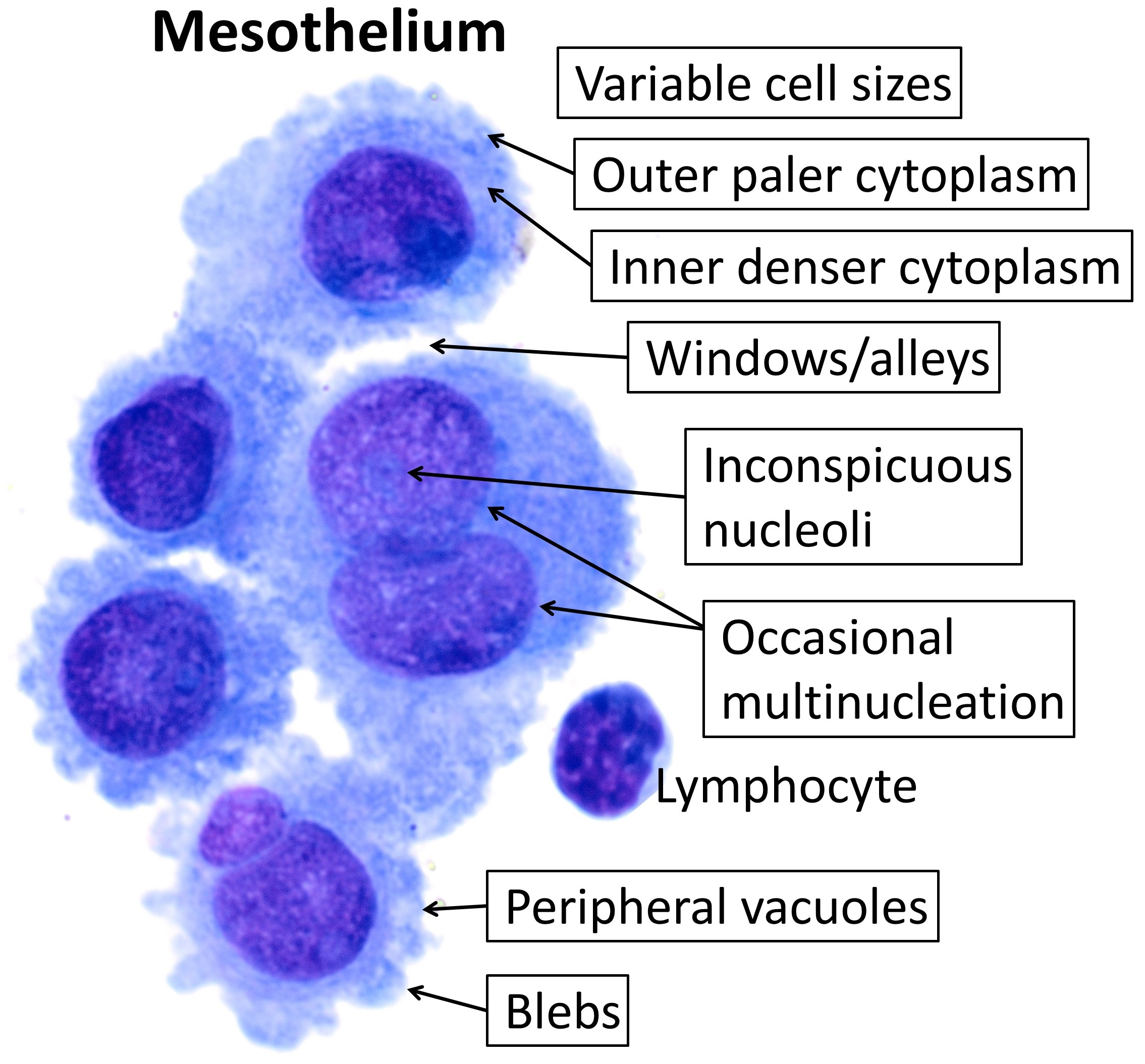
Cytology of the normal mesothelial cells that line the peritoneum, with typical features. Wright's stain

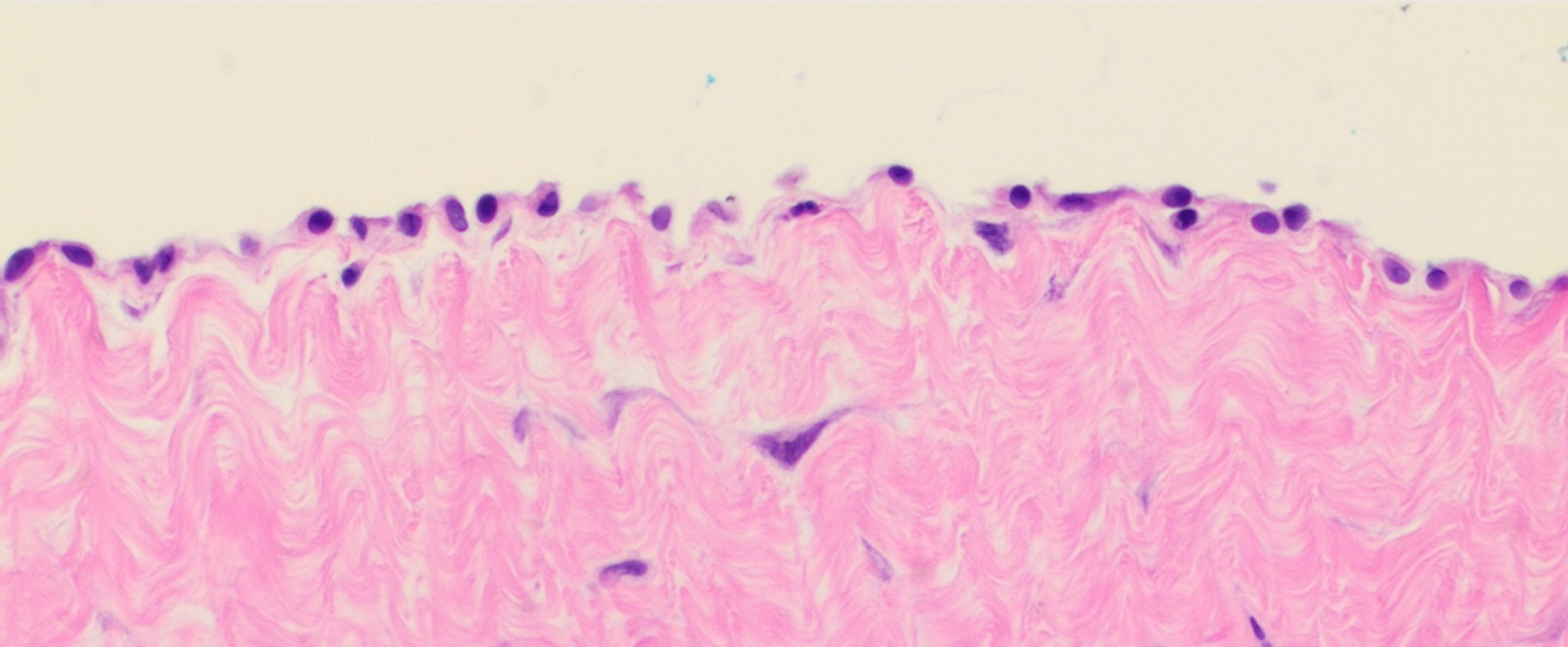
Histology of the peritoneal mesothelial lining, and underlying fibrous tissue. H&E stain.

== See also ==
- Omental foramen
