= Lesser sac =

Abdominal cavity

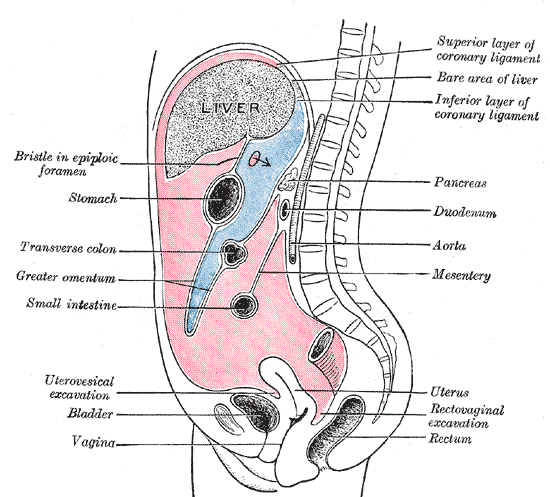
- The lesser sac (omental bursa) shown in blue, and the greater sac (general cavity) shown in red

Details

Identifiers
- Latin: bursa omentalis
- TA98: A10.1.02.402
- TA2: 3703
- FMA: 19800

The lesser sac, also known as the omental bursa, is a part of the peritoneal cavity that is formed by the lesser and greater omentum. Usually found in mammals, it is connected with the greater sac via the omental foramen or Foramen of Winslow. In mammals, it is common for the lesser sac to contain considerable amounts of fat.

== Anatomic margins ==
Anterior margin
listed from the top-to-bottom margin: Caudate lobe of the liver, lesser omentum, stomach, gastrocolic ligament

Lateral margin
listed from the most anterior to the most posterior margin: Gastrosplenic ligament, spleen, Lienorenal ligament

Posterior margin
Left kidney and adrenal gland, pancreas

Inferior margin
Greater omentum

Superior margin
Liver

If any of the marginal structures rupture their contents could leak into the lesser sac. If the stomach were to rupture on its anterior side though the leak would collect in the greater sac.

The lesser sac is formed during embryogenesis from an infolding of the greater omentum. The open end of the infolding, known as the omental foramen is usually close to the stomach.

== Additional images ==
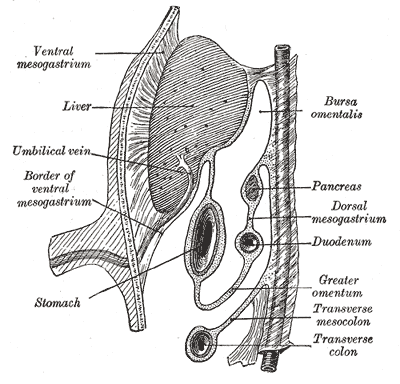
Schematic figure of the bursa omentalis, etc. Human embryo of eight weeks.

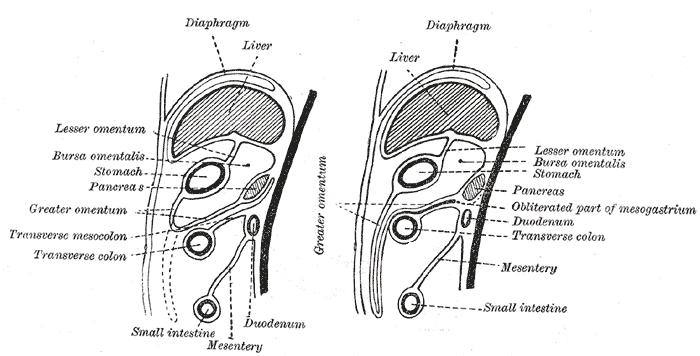
Diagrams to illustrate the development of the greater omentum and transverse mesocolon

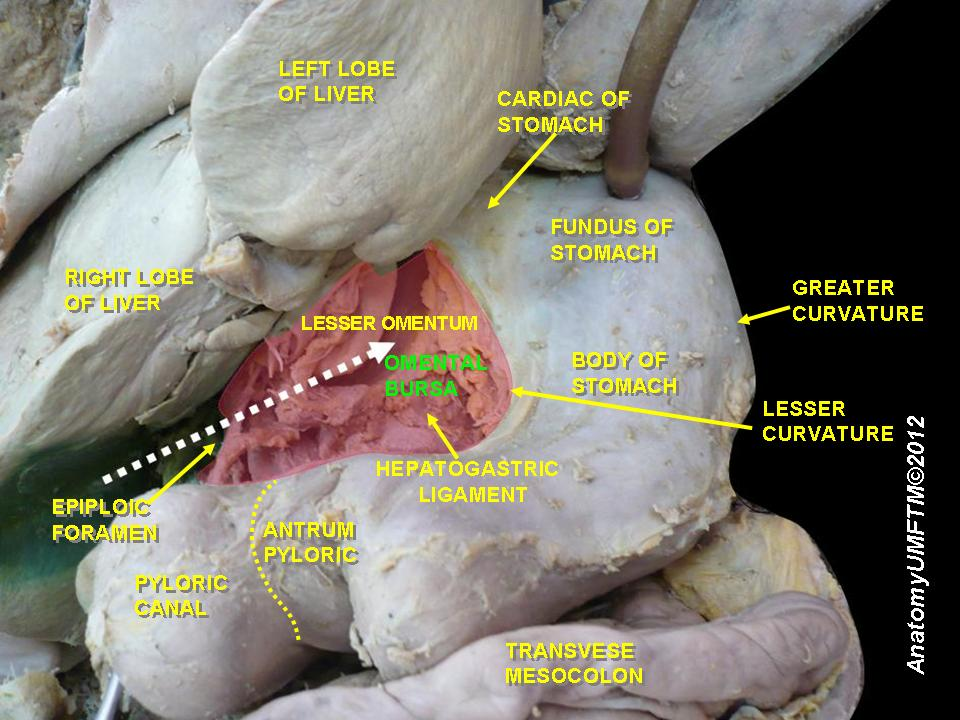
Omental bursa

== See also ==
- Terms for anatomical location
- Greater sac
- Omental foramen (Epiploic foramen, Foramen of Winslow)
- Lesser omentum
- Greater omentum
- Peritoneum
