= Saxon Infantry Regiment =

Former Swedish military formation

The Saxon Infantry Regiment (Swedish: Sachsiska infanteriregementet) was a Swedish military unit which was formed in 1707 through conscription of Saxon prisoners of war, and consisted of 1152 soldiers when at its full strength.

The regiment was commanded by J. B. Schommer from 1707 until 1716, when G. D. Zengerlein took command.

The unit was transferred to Finland where it took place in a campaign in Ingria in 1708. The regiment also participated in the battles of Scania in 1710, the Norwegian campaigns of 1716 and 1718 until it was relocated to the Gothenburg area where it acted as the Gothenburg city garrison. While in Gothenburg, the regiment fought in the defense of Nya Älvsborg at Göta älv, as well as in the defense of Carlsten fortress at Marstrand during Admiral Tordenskjolds attack in 1719.
