= Ann Rosman =

Swedish writer (born 1973)

Ann Rosman (born 27 February 1973) is a Swedish writer known for her crime fiction.

She lives in Marstrand, the setting for her series of novels featuring detective Karin Adler. Before she began writing, Rosman worked as an information technology specialist. Her novel Mercurium is based on actual historical events: the story of Metta Fock, who was convicted of murder in 1805.

She was awarded the Marstrand Prize in 2010. In 2013, she received the Kungälv city council Culture Award.

== Selected works ==
- Fyrmästarens dotter ("The Lighthouse Keeper's Daughter") (2009)
- Själakistan ("Soul casket") (2010)
- Porto Francos väktare ("Porto Franco Guardian") (2011)
- Mercurium (2012)
- Havskatten ("The Catfish") (2014)
- Vågspel ("Venture") (2016)
