= Henrich Danckwardt =

Swedish army officer

Henrich Danckwardt (c. 1670 – 16 September 1719) was a Swedish military officer.

== Biography ==
Danckwardt was born to Henrik Danckwardt and Elisabet Clerck, and was the grandson of Joachim Danckwardt. He served for 9 years as a page under queen consort Hedvig Eleonora. Danckwardt was named fänrik of the Västgöta-Dal Regiment in 1697 under Major Hugo Hamilton. Hamilton, during his previous service at another regiment, had then personally requested Danckwardt to be his captain. Hamilton was also responsible for Danckwardt's promotions to Major in 1711, and to Överstelöjtnant (Lieutenant colonel) in 1712.

After the debacle at Poltava, Hamilton's regiment was moved from Stockholm to Malmö, where it participated in the Battle of Helsingborg in 1710. In 1712, it moved to Gothenburg.

=== The defense of Carlsten fortress ===
Danckwardt was promoted to Colonel and commander of Carlsten fortress at Marstrand in 1712. When Carlsten was assaulted by Peder Tordenskjold's forces, Danckwardt was forced to surrender on 15 July 1719. Danckwardt was thereafter arrested while trying to evade custody, and sentenced to death.

The executioner was at the time, intoxicated and was therefore delayed. When the executioner at last arrived, he had to attempt the decapitation of Danckwardt twice before succeeding on 16 September 1719 in Gothenburg. The executioner received a formal warning.

Danckwardt's fellow officers were also later sentenced by the court martial to the death penalty, but were pardoned.

== Bibliography ==
- Ericson Wolke, Lars (1997). Lasse i Gatan: kaparkriget och det svenska stormaktsväldets fall (in Swedish). Lund: Historiska media. ISBN 91-88930-13-0. SELIBR 7776551.
- Svenska män och kvinnor, 2. Albert Bonniers förlag: Stockholm 1944
