= Anders Sinclair =

Scottish soldier in Swedish service

- Andrew Sinclair
- Born: 30 November 1614; Scotland
- Died: 31 December 1689 (aged 75); Gothenburg, Sweden
- Burial place: Gustavi Church, Gothenburg
- Military career
- Allegiance: Sweden
- Branch: Foot
- Service years: 1635-1689
- Rank: Colonel
- Conflicts: Thirty Years' War * Second Battle of Breitenfeld; Second Northern War * Battle of Warsaw * Defence of Toruń WIA * Defence of Malbork; Scanian War * Battle of Marstrand
- Awards: Land donations Nobility

Anders Sinclair (1614–1689) was one of many Scottish soldiers who joined Swedish service during the Thirty Years' War, rising to the rank of colonel, and holding several military governorship of important fortress towns in Sweden.

Sinclair enlisted 1635 in Robert Stewart's Scottish regiment in Swedish service, as a private musketeer; promoted to corporal 1637; sergeant 1640; ensign 1643. Transferred to Närke-Värmland Regiment as ensign 1644. Lieutenant in Skaraborg Regiment 1647; captain 1655; major 1660; lieutenant-colonel 1674. Commander in Marstrand 1675; military governor of Kalmar 1676; of Marstrand 1676; promoted to colonel 1676; military governor of Halmstad 1678. During the defence of Toruń 1658, Sinclair was shot four times, through both arms and in his head, while he and his men beat back the enemy eight times.

Sinclair was son of John Sinclair, and grandson of James Sinclair, Baron of Randel. He married twice, first Anna Botvidsdotter in 1648, in a marriage that left no living children; in 1670 Anna Amundsdotter, with whom he had three sons, through which he became the ancestor of the barons and counts Sinclair of Sweden, having been naturalized as a Swedish nobleman in 1680. In 1661 the King donated the income from three farms in Västergötland to him.
