= Tjuvkil =

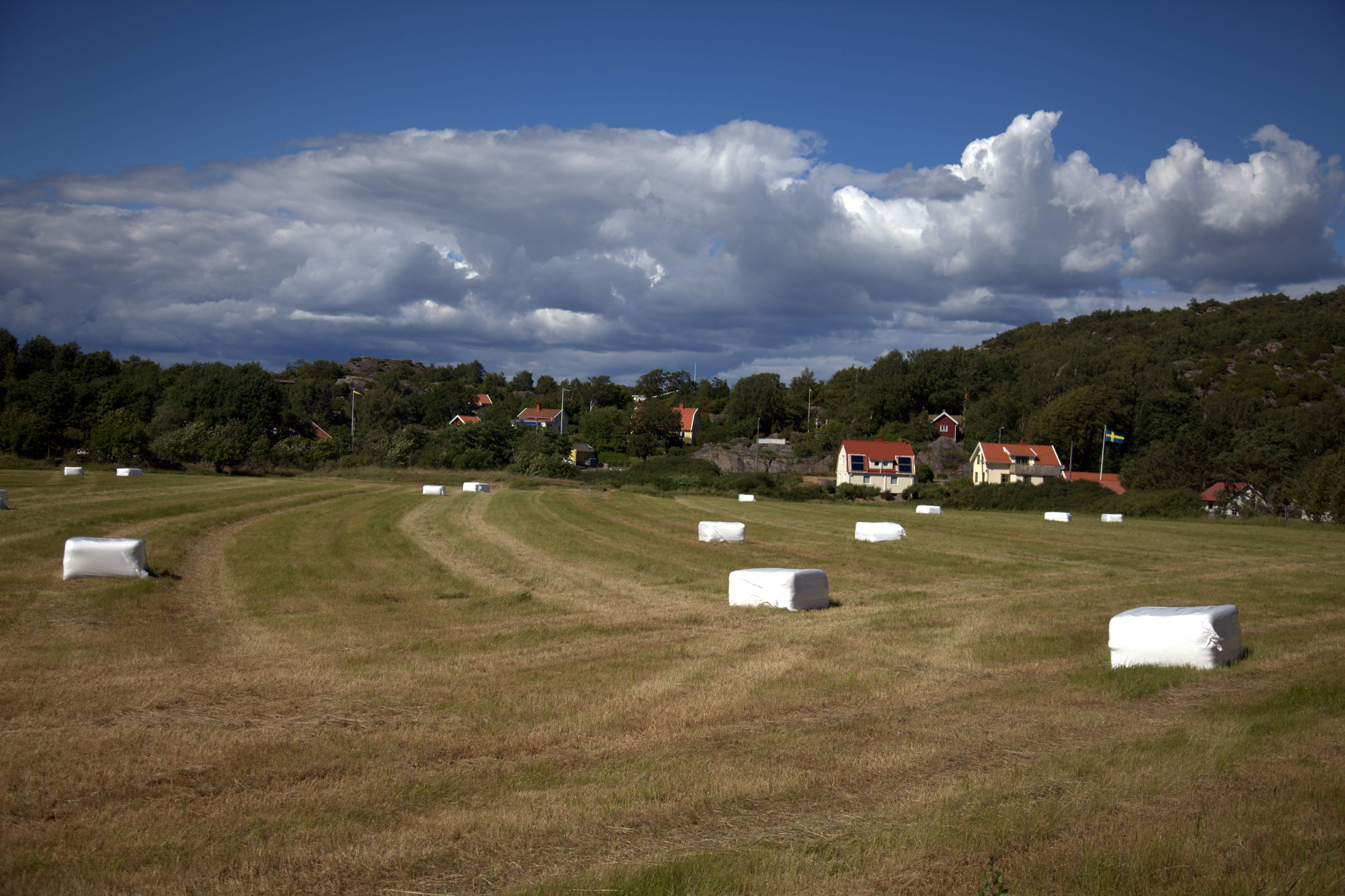

- Location within Västra Götaland Location within Sweden
- Coordinates: 57°54′N 11°44′E
- Country: Sweden
- Province: Bohuslän
- County: Västra Götaland County
- Municipality: Kungälv Municipality

Area
  - Total: 0.89 km^{2} (0.34 sq mi)

Population (31 December 2010)
  - Total: 501
  - Density: 565/km^{2} (1,460/sq mi)
- Time zone: UTC+1 (CET)
  - Summer (DST): UTC+2 (CEST)

Tjuvkil is a locality situated in Kungälv Municipality, Västra Götaland County, Sweden. It had 501 inhabitants in 2010.
