= Battle of Marstrand =

1677 battle of the Scanian War

- Part of the Scanian War
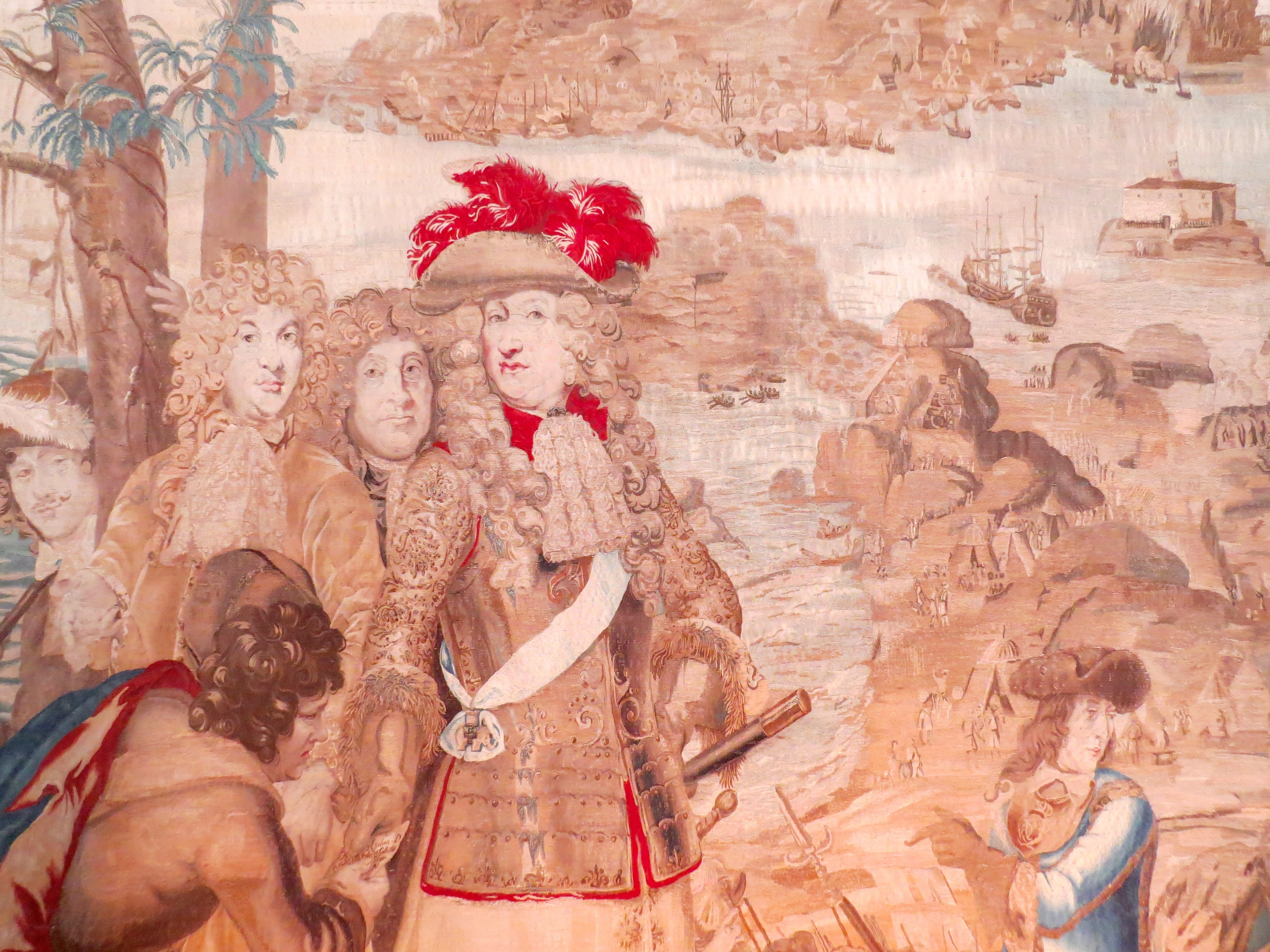
- Ulrik Frederik Gyldenløve at Marstrand
Date	6–23 July 1677
Location	Marstrand, Sweden 57°53′09″N 11°34′51″E
Result	Dano-Norwegian victory

Belligerents
(yes) Swedish Empire	Denmark–Norway

Commanders and leaders
(Swedish Empire) Anders Sinclair	(Denmark–Norway) Ulrik Frederik Gyldenløve

Strength
600	1,600 – 3,000
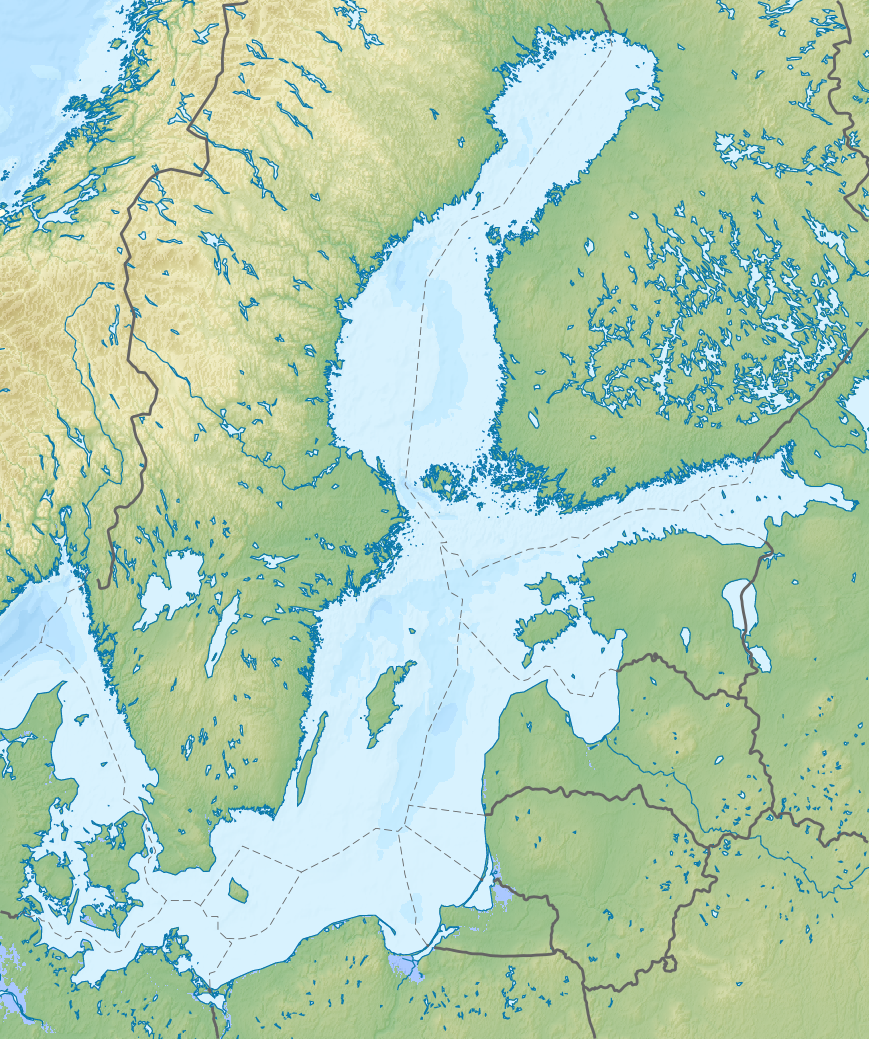
- Location within Västra Götaland Battle of Marstrand (Sweden) Battle of Marstrand (Baltic Sea)

The Battle of Marstrand was a successful Dano-Norwegian siege of the harbor town of Marstrand, Sweden which took place between 6–23 July 1677, during the Scanian War.

== Prelude ==
In January 1677, a strong point in Strömstad was taken by a Swedish force. After a fiercely cold winter struck, no military movements took place until June, when Ulrik Frederik Gyldenløve sent 2,000 men under the command of general Hans Løvenhjelm across the border to Bohuslän to retake Strömstad. After doing this Løvenhielm proceeded to Uddevalla. Simultaneously, Gyldenløve shipped out a considerable force (1,600 men according to Danish sources, 3,000 according to Swedish sources) in the direction of Marstrand. He landed on the neighboring island of Koön on 6 July and began besieging the town.

== Development ==
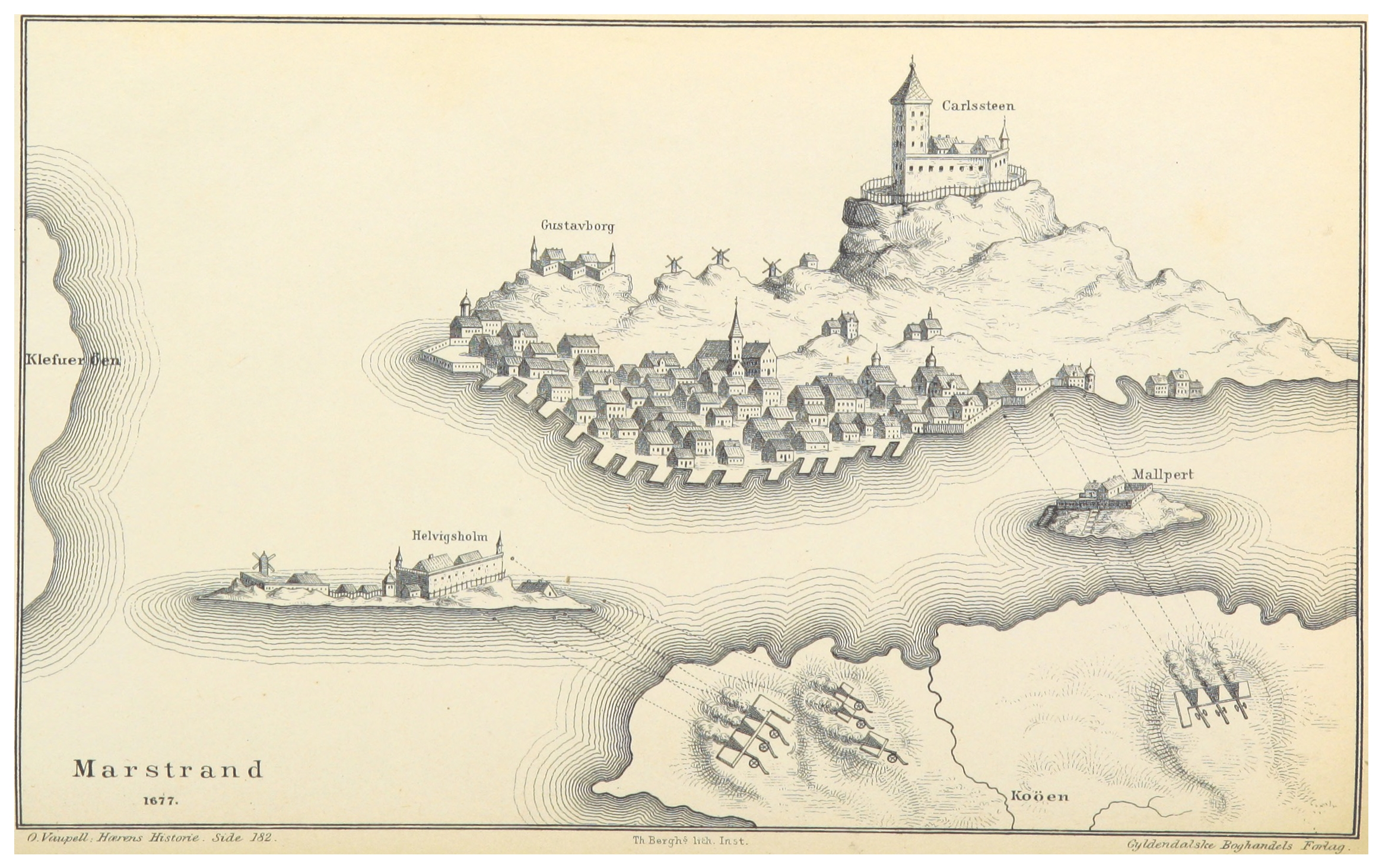
Carlsten fortress during the Danish siege, 1677, with Hedvigsholm, Malepert, and Gustafsberg.

Marstrand was defended by the fortress of Carlsten and the three strong-points Malepert (on the east side of the northern harbour inlet), Gustafsborg (by the southern harbour inlet), and Hedvigsholm (on a skerry located in the harbour itself). The defenders tallied 600, led by commander (kommendant) Anders Sinclair.

The Danes attacked Hedvigsholm first; after withstanding several attacks, the Swedes defending it were forced to abandon it and retire to Carlsten on 20 July. Malepert had been taken already on 13 July and Gustafsberg was abandoned soon thereafter. Carlsten no longer had outposts, and after strong bombardment from all sides, finally surrendered on 23 July, with the condition that the commander along with his men would be sent to Värmland.

== Aftermath ==
After taking Carlsten, Gyldenløve installed a strong detachment of troops under Løvenhjelm to defend Marstrand before returning to Norway. Through the conquest of Marstrand Denmark obtained a safe, ice-free harbour. This in turn further enabled the Danish blockade of Gothenburg. However, Løvenhjelm soon found himself threatened by approaching Swedish forces, and retired with his men to Strömstad in August.
