= Carlsten =

Fortress on the Swedish coast

- Karlstens fästning
- Marstrand in Sweden
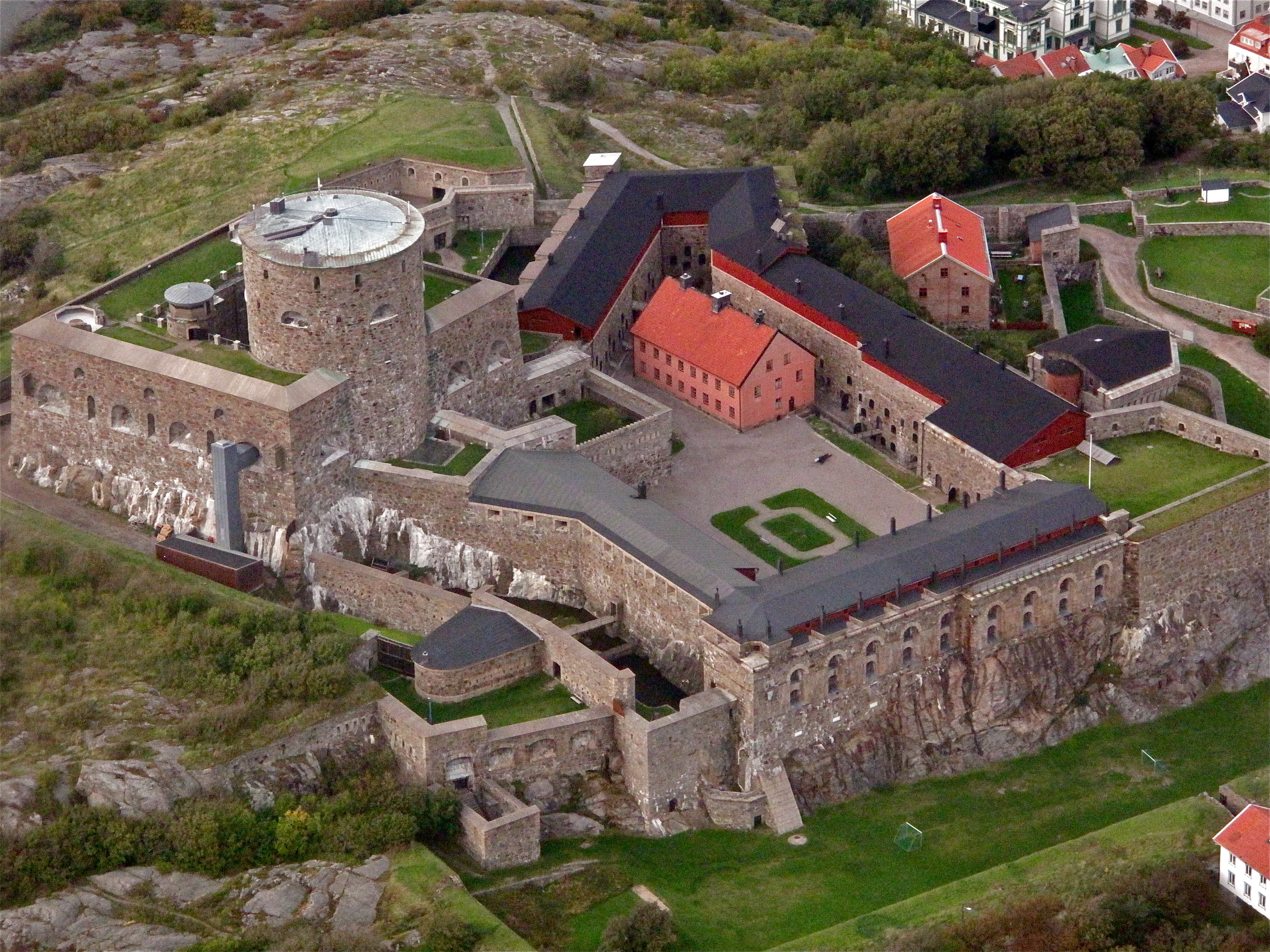
- Carlsten Fortress, 2009.

Site information
- Type: Fortification
- Controlled by: Sweden, Norway, Denmark–Norway, Sweden
- Open to the public: Yes

Location
- Location within Southern Sweden
- Coordinates: 57°53′10″N 11°34′42″E

Site history
- Built: 1658–1860
- In use: 1658–1882
- Materials: Granite, brick
- Battles/wars: Battle of Marstrand; Attack on Marstrand

Carlsten (Swedish: Karlstens fästning) is a stone fortress located at Marstrand, on the western coast of Sweden. The fortress was built on the orders of King Carl X of Sweden following the Treaty of Roskilde, 1658 to protect the newly acquired province of Bohuslän from hostile attacks. The site of Marstrand was chosen because of its location and its access to an ice free port. The fortress was decommissioned as a permanent defense installation in 1882, but remained in military use until the early 1990s.

== History ==
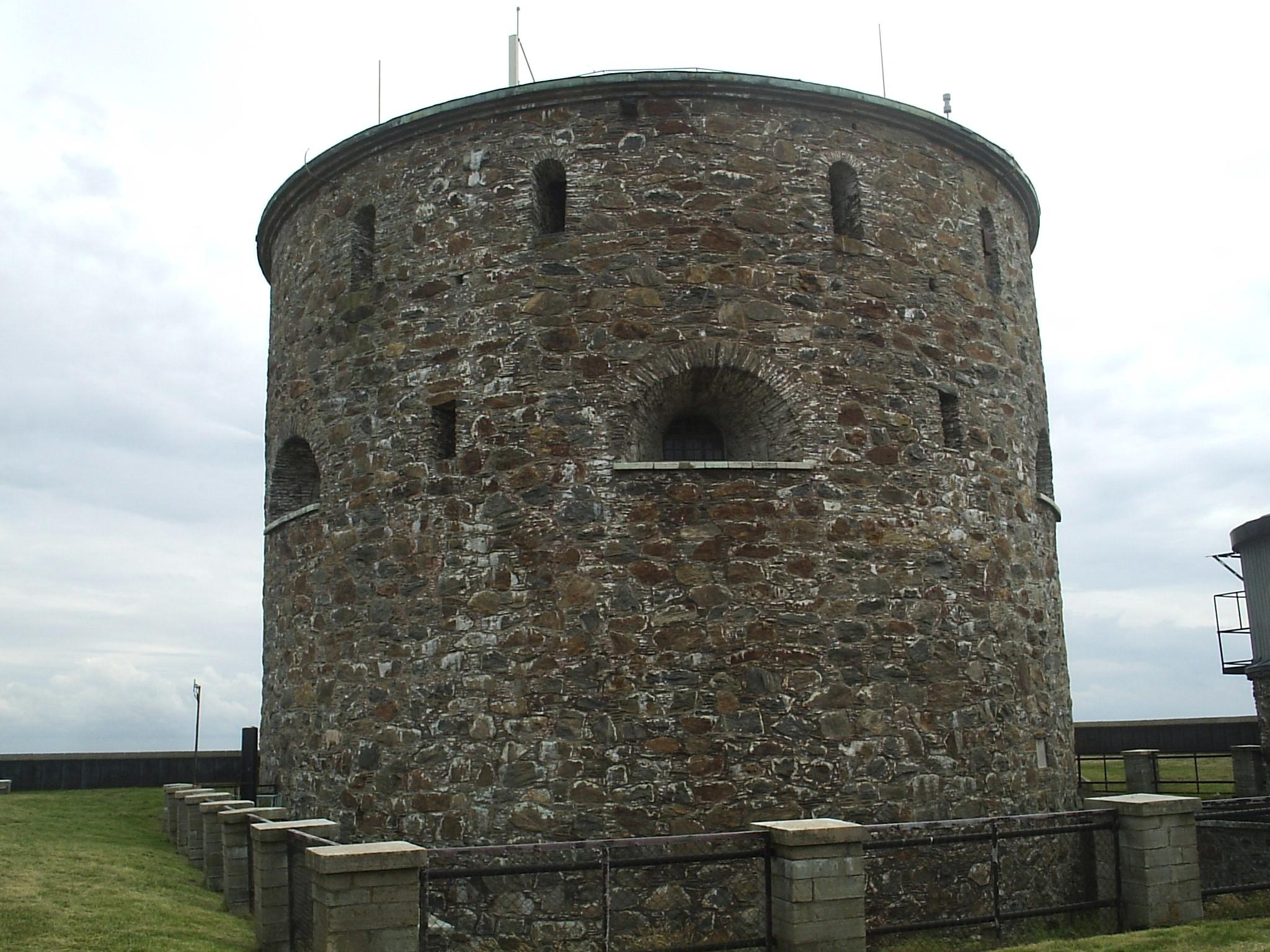
Tower. The highest part of the fortress.

After peace in Roskilde in 1658, Bohuslän and thus Marstrand became Swedish. The city has long been a major trading place. Since the harbor almost never freezes, part of the Swedish Navy was stationed here. To defend Marstrand, Karl X Gustav decided to build a fortress on the island. On 23 July 1677, after an attack on the fortifications in Marstrand, Carlsten was conquered by Ulrik Frederik Gyldenløve, the Danish military commander in Norway. In 1719, the fortress was attacked and besieged for a second time in its history by the Norwegian Vice-Admiral Tordenskjold, falling into enemy hands. The fortress was returned to Swedish control through negotiations and treaties.

== Construction ==
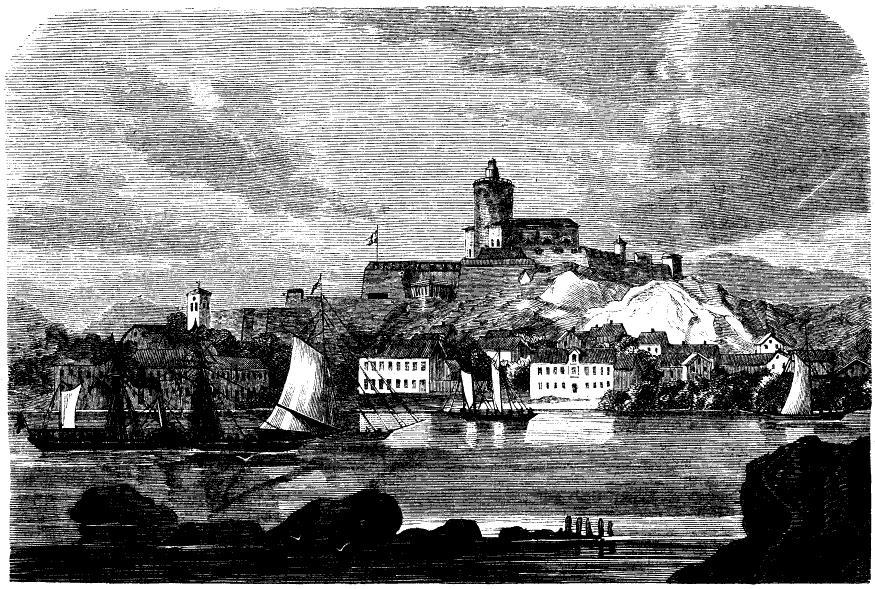
Carlsten in 1867.

In 1658, under the leadership of Johan Wärnschöld, a makeshift fortification was built in the form of a wooden Wahlen skans, at the top of the mountain above the city's "big weather mill". This fortification was of great use in autumn 1659 to fight back the attack carried out by Norwegian forces. In 1666, the construction of a replacement building for the wooden edging, which "struck", began. This new fortress was in the form of a Roman redoubt, or tower building with four small ravelins. In 1671–73, the tower, which was then called Karlsten, was built on one floor and was equipped with a roof battery. Initially a square stone tower was constructed, but in 1681, the construction of a large round shaped tower began, following the commander Carl Gustaf Frölich's design, but otherwise new construction, on drawings created by Erik Dahlbergh, was approved in general in 1685, and as early as 1689 the fortress itself was almost completed, consisting then of a brick redoubt and a high multi-storey tower, which included the former square.

The work was carried out by prisoners sentenced to penal labour. Successive additions to the fortress were carried out until 1860 when it was finally completed. Carlsten was exclusively a prison for men. Nonetheless, Metta Fock, a female prisoner, was to have been kept there 1806-1809. The most famous prisoner of Carlsten was arguably Lasse-Maja, who was imprisoned here in 1813-1838.

== See also ==
- Bohus Fortress
- Fredriksten
- Pater Noster Lighthouse (replaced light present at Carlsten 1781–1868)
- Kungälv Municipality
- Israel
